

431001–431100 

|-bgcolor=#E9E9E9
| 431001 ||  || — || February 8, 2002 || Kitt Peak || Spacewatch || — || align=right | 1.2 km || 
|-id=002 bgcolor=#E9E9E9
| 431002 ||  || — || December 24, 2005 || Kitt Peak || Spacewatch || MIS || align=right | 1.9 km || 
|-id=003 bgcolor=#E9E9E9
| 431003 ||  || — || December 24, 2005 || Kitt Peak || Spacewatch || — || align=right data-sort-value="0.85" | 850 m || 
|-id=004 bgcolor=#E9E9E9
| 431004 ||  || — || December 25, 2005 || Kitt Peak || Spacewatch || — || align=right | 1.0 km || 
|-id=005 bgcolor=#E9E9E9
| 431005 ||  || — || December 5, 2005 || Mount Lemmon || Mount Lemmon Survey || — || align=right | 1.4 km || 
|-id=006 bgcolor=#E9E9E9
| 431006 ||  || — || December 24, 2005 || Kitt Peak || Spacewatch || — || align=right | 1.1 km || 
|-id=007 bgcolor=#E9E9E9
| 431007 ||  || — || December 24, 2005 || Catalina || CSS || — || align=right | 1.7 km || 
|-id=008 bgcolor=#E9E9E9
| 431008 ||  || — || December 24, 2005 || Kitt Peak || Spacewatch || — || align=right | 1.2 km || 
|-id=009 bgcolor=#E9E9E9
| 431009 ||  || — || December 8, 2005 || Kitt Peak || Spacewatch || — || align=right | 1.0 km || 
|-id=010 bgcolor=#E9E9E9
| 431010 ||  || — || December 25, 2005 || Mount Lemmon || Mount Lemmon Survey || — || align=right | 1.8 km || 
|-id=011 bgcolor=#E9E9E9
| 431011 ||  || — || December 25, 2005 || Mount Lemmon || Mount Lemmon Survey || — || align=right data-sort-value="0.87" | 870 m || 
|-id=012 bgcolor=#E9E9E9
| 431012 ||  || — || December 24, 2005 || Kitt Peak || Spacewatch || (5) || align=right data-sort-value="0.87" | 870 m || 
|-id=013 bgcolor=#E9E9E9
| 431013 ||  || — || December 25, 2005 || Kitt Peak || Spacewatch || EUN || align=right | 1.2 km || 
|-id=014 bgcolor=#E9E9E9
| 431014 ||  || — || December 28, 2005 || Mount Lemmon || Mount Lemmon Survey || — || align=right data-sort-value="0.85" | 850 m || 
|-id=015 bgcolor=#E9E9E9
| 431015 ||  || — || October 29, 2005 || Mount Lemmon || Mount Lemmon Survey || — || align=right | 1.2 km || 
|-id=016 bgcolor=#E9E9E9
| 431016 ||  || — || December 25, 2005 || Mount Lemmon || Mount Lemmon Survey || — || align=right | 1.4 km || 
|-id=017 bgcolor=#E9E9E9
| 431017 ||  || — || December 26, 2005 || Kitt Peak || Spacewatch || (5) || align=right data-sort-value="0.91" | 910 m || 
|-id=018 bgcolor=#E9E9E9
| 431018 ||  || — || December 28, 2005 || Kitt Peak || Spacewatch || — || align=right | 2.7 km || 
|-id=019 bgcolor=#E9E9E9
| 431019 ||  || — || December 29, 2005 || Socorro || LINEAR || — || align=right | 1.4 km || 
|-id=020 bgcolor=#E9E9E9
| 431020 ||  || — || December 29, 2005 || Mount Lemmon || Mount Lemmon Survey || — || align=right | 1.3 km || 
|-id=021 bgcolor=#E9E9E9
| 431021 ||  || — || December 25, 2005 || Kitt Peak || Spacewatch || — || align=right | 1.5 km || 
|-id=022 bgcolor=#E9E9E9
| 431022 ||  || — || December 22, 2005 || Kitt Peak || Spacewatch || — || align=right | 1.1 km || 
|-id=023 bgcolor=#E9E9E9
| 431023 ||  || — || December 25, 2005 || Mount Lemmon || Mount Lemmon Survey || — || align=right | 1.4 km || 
|-id=024 bgcolor=#E9E9E9
| 431024 ||  || — || December 24, 2005 || Kitt Peak || Spacewatch || — || align=right | 1.0 km || 
|-id=025 bgcolor=#E9E9E9
| 431025 ||  || — || December 28, 2005 || Catalina || CSS || — || align=right | 1.6 km || 
|-id=026 bgcolor=#E9E9E9
| 431026 ||  || — || December 28, 2005 || Mount Lemmon || Mount Lemmon Survey || — || align=right | 1.8 km || 
|-id=027 bgcolor=#E9E9E9
| 431027 ||  || — || December 7, 2005 || Kitt Peak || Spacewatch || — || align=right | 1.4 km || 
|-id=028 bgcolor=#E9E9E9
| 431028 ||  || — || January 5, 2006 || Mount Lemmon || Mount Lemmon Survey || — || align=right | 1.8 km || 
|-id=029 bgcolor=#E9E9E9
| 431029 ||  || — || October 1, 2005 || Mount Lemmon || Mount Lemmon Survey || — || align=right | 1.5 km || 
|-id=030 bgcolor=#E9E9E9
| 431030 ||  || — || December 27, 2005 || Mount Lemmon || Mount Lemmon Survey || — || align=right | 2.0 km || 
|-id=031 bgcolor=#E9E9E9
| 431031 ||  || — || January 7, 2006 || Mount Lemmon || Mount Lemmon Survey || — || align=right | 1.2 km || 
|-id=032 bgcolor=#E9E9E9
| 431032 ||  || — || January 4, 2006 || Kitt Peak || Spacewatch || (5) || align=right data-sort-value="0.90" | 900 m || 
|-id=033 bgcolor=#E9E9E9
| 431033 ||  || — || January 5, 2006 || Kitt Peak || Spacewatch || — || align=right | 1.1 km || 
|-id=034 bgcolor=#E9E9E9
| 431034 ||  || — || January 4, 2006 || Kitt Peak || Spacewatch || — || align=right | 1.4 km || 
|-id=035 bgcolor=#E9E9E9
| 431035 ||  || — || January 2, 2006 || Socorro || LINEAR || — || align=right | 2.3 km || 
|-id=036 bgcolor=#E9E9E9
| 431036 ||  || — || January 12, 2006 || Palomar || NEAT || — || align=right | 1.6 km || 
|-id=037 bgcolor=#E9E9E9
| 431037 ||  || — || January 6, 2006 || Mount Lemmon || Mount Lemmon Survey || — || align=right | 1.4 km || 
|-id=038 bgcolor=#E9E9E9
| 431038 ||  || — || January 9, 2006 || Kitt Peak || Spacewatch || (5) || align=right | 1.1 km || 
|-id=039 bgcolor=#E9E9E9
| 431039 ||  || — || January 20, 2006 || Kitt Peak || Spacewatch || — || align=right | 1.2 km || 
|-id=040 bgcolor=#E9E9E9
| 431040 ||  || — || January 21, 2006 || Kitt Peak || Spacewatch || — || align=right | 1.3 km || 
|-id=041 bgcolor=#E9E9E9
| 431041 ||  || — || January 22, 2006 || Mount Lemmon || Mount Lemmon Survey || (5) || align=right data-sort-value="0.78" | 780 m || 
|-id=042 bgcolor=#E9E9E9
| 431042 ||  || — || January 5, 2006 || Mount Lemmon || Mount Lemmon Survey || — || align=right | 1.3 km || 
|-id=043 bgcolor=#E9E9E9
| 431043 ||  || — || January 7, 2006 || Mount Lemmon || Mount Lemmon Survey || — || align=right | 1.4 km || 
|-id=044 bgcolor=#E9E9E9
| 431044 ||  || — || January 23, 2006 || Socorro || LINEAR || — || align=right | 2.6 km || 
|-id=045 bgcolor=#E9E9E9
| 431045 ||  || — || January 20, 2006 || Kitt Peak || Spacewatch || — || align=right | 2.1 km || 
|-id=046 bgcolor=#E9E9E9
| 431046 ||  || — || January 25, 2006 || Kitt Peak || Spacewatch || — || align=right | 1.3 km || 
|-id=047 bgcolor=#E9E9E9
| 431047 ||  || — || January 7, 2006 || Kitt Peak || Spacewatch || — || align=right | 1.5 km || 
|-id=048 bgcolor=#E9E9E9
| 431048 ||  || — || January 25, 2006 || Kitt Peak || Spacewatch || — || align=right | 2.8 km || 
|-id=049 bgcolor=#E9E9E9
| 431049 ||  || — || November 14, 1996 || Kitt Peak || Spacewatch || — || align=right | 1.5 km || 
|-id=050 bgcolor=#E9E9E9
| 431050 ||  || — || January 23, 2006 || Kitt Peak || Spacewatch || (5) || align=right data-sort-value="0.99" | 990 m || 
|-id=051 bgcolor=#E9E9E9
| 431051 ||  || — || January 24, 2006 || Socorro || LINEAR || — || align=right | 2.9 km || 
|-id=052 bgcolor=#E9E9E9
| 431052 ||  || — || January 26, 2006 || Kitt Peak || Spacewatch || — || align=right | 1.8 km || 
|-id=053 bgcolor=#E9E9E9
| 431053 ||  || — || January 26, 2006 || Kitt Peak || Spacewatch || — || align=right | 1.4 km || 
|-id=054 bgcolor=#E9E9E9
| 431054 ||  || — || January 26, 2006 || Kitt Peak || Spacewatch || — || align=right | 2.3 km || 
|-id=055 bgcolor=#E9E9E9
| 431055 ||  || — || January 26, 2006 || Kitt Peak || Spacewatch || — || align=right | 2.0 km || 
|-id=056 bgcolor=#E9E9E9
| 431056 ||  || — || January 26, 2006 || Kitt Peak || Spacewatch || AGN || align=right | 1.0 km || 
|-id=057 bgcolor=#E9E9E9
| 431057 ||  || — || February 12, 2002 || Kitt Peak || Spacewatch || — || align=right | 1.4 km || 
|-id=058 bgcolor=#E9E9E9
| 431058 ||  || — || January 28, 2006 || Mount Lemmon || Mount Lemmon Survey || WIT || align=right data-sort-value="0.99" | 990 m || 
|-id=059 bgcolor=#E9E9E9
| 431059 ||  || — || January 25, 2006 || Kitt Peak || Spacewatch || — || align=right | 1.9 km || 
|-id=060 bgcolor=#E9E9E9
| 431060 ||  || — || January 26, 2006 || Mount Lemmon || Mount Lemmon Survey || — || align=right | 1.8 km || 
|-id=061 bgcolor=#E9E9E9
| 431061 ||  || — || January 23, 2006 || Kitt Peak || Spacewatch || (5) || align=right data-sort-value="0.88" | 880 m || 
|-id=062 bgcolor=#E9E9E9
| 431062 ||  || — || January 28, 2006 || Mount Lemmon || Mount Lemmon Survey || — || align=right | 1.3 km || 
|-id=063 bgcolor=#E9E9E9
| 431063 ||  || — || January 28, 2006 || Mount Lemmon || Mount Lemmon Survey || — || align=right | 1.2 km || 
|-id=064 bgcolor=#E9E9E9
| 431064 ||  || — || January 23, 2006 || Mount Lemmon || Mount Lemmon Survey || — || align=right | 1.4 km || 
|-id=065 bgcolor=#E9E9E9
| 431065 ||  || — || January 31, 2006 || Mount Lemmon || Mount Lemmon Survey || EUN || align=right | 1.3 km || 
|-id=066 bgcolor=#E9E9E9
| 431066 ||  || — || January 31, 2006 || Catalina || CSS || — || align=right | 2.4 km || 
|-id=067 bgcolor=#E9E9E9
| 431067 ||  || — || January 30, 2006 || Kitt Peak || Spacewatch || — || align=right | 1.3 km || 
|-id=068 bgcolor=#E9E9E9
| 431068 ||  || — || January 23, 2006 || Kitt Peak || Spacewatch || — || align=right | 1.4 km || 
|-id=069 bgcolor=#E9E9E9
| 431069 ||  || — || January 31, 2006 || Kitt Peak || Spacewatch || — || align=right data-sort-value="0.91" | 910 m || 
|-id=070 bgcolor=#E9E9E9
| 431070 ||  || — || January 25, 2006 || Kitt Peak || Spacewatch || (5) || align=right data-sort-value="0.81" | 810 m || 
|-id=071 bgcolor=#E9E9E9
| 431071 ||  || — || January 25, 2006 || Kitt Peak || Spacewatch || — || align=right | 1.7 km || 
|-id=072 bgcolor=#E9E9E9
| 431072 ||  || — || January 31, 2006 || Kitt Peak || Spacewatch || — || align=right | 1.2 km || 
|-id=073 bgcolor=#E9E9E9
| 431073 ||  || — || January 23, 2006 || Mount Lemmon || Mount Lemmon Survey || — || align=right | 1.3 km || 
|-id=074 bgcolor=#E9E9E9
| 431074 ||  || — || February 1, 2006 || Kitt Peak || Spacewatch || — || align=right | 1.6 km || 
|-id=075 bgcolor=#E9E9E9
| 431075 ||  || — || January 25, 2006 || Kitt Peak || Spacewatch ||  || align=right | 1.6 km || 
|-id=076 bgcolor=#E9E9E9
| 431076 ||  || — || February 3, 2006 || Socorro || LINEAR || — || align=right | 2.2 km || 
|-id=077 bgcolor=#E9E9E9
| 431077 ||  || — || February 7, 2006 || Kitt Peak || Spacewatch || — || align=right | 1.9 km || 
|-id=078 bgcolor=#E9E9E9
| 431078 ||  || — || February 20, 2006 || Kitt Peak || Spacewatch || — || align=right | 1.4 km || 
|-id=079 bgcolor=#E9E9E9
| 431079 ||  || — || January 31, 2006 || Kitt Peak || Spacewatch || WIT || align=right | 1.1 km || 
|-id=080 bgcolor=#E9E9E9
| 431080 ||  || — || February 20, 2006 || Kitt Peak || Spacewatch || MIS || align=right | 1.9 km || 
|-id=081 bgcolor=#E9E9E9
| 431081 ||  || — || February 1, 2006 || Kitt Peak || Spacewatch || — || align=right | 2.2 km || 
|-id=082 bgcolor=#E9E9E9
| 431082 ||  || — || February 1, 2006 || Kitt Peak || Spacewatch || (5) || align=right data-sort-value="0.88" | 880 m || 
|-id=083 bgcolor=#E9E9E9
| 431083 ||  || — || February 20, 2006 || Kitt Peak || Spacewatch || — || align=right | 2.1 km || 
|-id=084 bgcolor=#E9E9E9
| 431084 ||  || — || February 20, 2006 || Kitt Peak || Spacewatch || — || align=right | 1.6 km || 
|-id=085 bgcolor=#E9E9E9
| 431085 ||  || — || February 24, 2006 || Mount Lemmon || Mount Lemmon Survey || GEF || align=right | 1.2 km || 
|-id=086 bgcolor=#E9E9E9
| 431086 ||  || — || February 24, 2006 || Kitt Peak || Spacewatch || — || align=right | 1.5 km || 
|-id=087 bgcolor=#E9E9E9
| 431087 ||  || — || February 24, 2006 || Kitt Peak || Spacewatch || — || align=right | 2.0 km || 
|-id=088 bgcolor=#E9E9E9
| 431088 ||  || — || February 24, 2006 || Kitt Peak || Spacewatch || — || align=right | 1.9 km || 
|-id=089 bgcolor=#E9E9E9
| 431089 ||  || — || February 25, 2006 || Mount Lemmon || Mount Lemmon Survey || — || align=right | 2.4 km || 
|-id=090 bgcolor=#E9E9E9
| 431090 ||  || — || February 25, 2006 || Mount Lemmon || Mount Lemmon Survey || — || align=right | 2.3 km || 
|-id=091 bgcolor=#E9E9E9
| 431091 ||  || — || February 25, 2006 || Kitt Peak || Spacewatch || — || align=right | 2.0 km || 
|-id=092 bgcolor=#E9E9E9
| 431092 ||  || — || February 27, 2006 || Mount Lemmon || Mount Lemmon Survey || MAR || align=right | 1.2 km || 
|-id=093 bgcolor=#E9E9E9
| 431093 ||  || — || February 25, 2006 || Kitt Peak || Spacewatch || — || align=right | 2.9 km || 
|-id=094 bgcolor=#E9E9E9
| 431094 ||  || — || February 27, 2006 || Kitt Peak || Spacewatch || — || align=right | 1.9 km || 
|-id=095 bgcolor=#E9E9E9
| 431095 ||  || — || February 27, 2006 || Kitt Peak || Spacewatch || — || align=right | 2.0 km || 
|-id=096 bgcolor=#E9E9E9
| 431096 ||  || — || February 27, 2006 || Kitt Peak || Spacewatch || — || align=right | 1.4 km || 
|-id=097 bgcolor=#E9E9E9
| 431097 ||  || — || February 27, 2006 || Kitt Peak || Spacewatch || — || align=right | 2.4 km || 
|-id=098 bgcolor=#E9E9E9
| 431098 ||  || — || February 25, 2006 || Mount Lemmon || Mount Lemmon Survey || — || align=right | 1.2 km || 
|-id=099 bgcolor=#E9E9E9
| 431099 ||  || — || February 25, 2006 || Mount Lemmon || Mount Lemmon Survey || — || align=right | 2.6 km || 
|-id=100 bgcolor=#E9E9E9
| 431100 ||  || — || March 2, 2006 || Kitt Peak || Spacewatch || — || align=right | 1.4 km || 
|}

431101–431200 

|-bgcolor=#E9E9E9
| 431101 ||  || — || March 2, 2006 || Kitt Peak || Spacewatch || — || align=right | 1.6 km || 
|-id=102 bgcolor=#E9E9E9
| 431102 ||  || — || January 31, 2006 || Kitt Peak || Spacewatch || — || align=right | 1.6 km || 
|-id=103 bgcolor=#E9E9E9
| 431103 ||  || — || March 3, 2006 || Kitt Peak || Spacewatch || — || align=right | 1.2 km || 
|-id=104 bgcolor=#E9E9E9
| 431104 ||  || — || February 20, 2006 || Mount Lemmon || Mount Lemmon Survey || — || align=right | 2.1 km || 
|-id=105 bgcolor=#E9E9E9
| 431105 ||  || — || March 24, 2006 || Mount Lemmon || Mount Lemmon Survey || — || align=right | 2.1 km || 
|-id=106 bgcolor=#E9E9E9
| 431106 ||  || — || March 29, 2006 || Socorro || LINEAR || — || align=right | 2.5 km || 
|-id=107 bgcolor=#FFC2E0
| 431107 ||  || — || April 2, 2006 || Catalina || CSS || AMO +1kmcritical || align=right | 1.3 km || 
|-id=108 bgcolor=#E9E9E9
| 431108 ||  || — || April 2, 2006 || Kitt Peak || Spacewatch || — || align=right | 2.6 km || 
|-id=109 bgcolor=#E9E9E9
| 431109 ||  || — || March 26, 2006 || Mount Lemmon || Mount Lemmon Survey || GEF || align=right | 1.2 km || 
|-id=110 bgcolor=#E9E9E9
| 431110 ||  || — || April 7, 2006 || Mount Lemmon || Mount Lemmon Survey || — || align=right | 1.5 km || 
|-id=111 bgcolor=#E9E9E9
| 431111 ||  || — || April 2, 2006 || Anderson Mesa || LONEOS || — || align=right | 2.5 km || 
|-id=112 bgcolor=#E9E9E9
| 431112 ||  || — || March 25, 2006 || Kitt Peak || Spacewatch || — || align=right | 2.3 km || 
|-id=113 bgcolor=#E9E9E9
| 431113 ||  || — || April 19, 2006 || Kitt Peak || Spacewatch || — || align=right | 2.7 km || 
|-id=114 bgcolor=#E9E9E9
| 431114 ||  || — || April 19, 2006 || Mount Lemmon || Mount Lemmon Survey || — || align=right | 2.3 km || 
|-id=115 bgcolor=#E9E9E9
| 431115 ||  || — || April 2, 2006 || Kitt Peak || Spacewatch || — || align=right | 2.0 km || 
|-id=116 bgcolor=#E9E9E9
| 431116 ||  || — || April 19, 2006 || Catalina || CSS || — || align=right | 2.0 km || 
|-id=117 bgcolor=#E9E9E9
| 431117 ||  || — || April 21, 2006 || Kitt Peak || Spacewatch || — || align=right | 2.4 km || 
|-id=118 bgcolor=#E9E9E9
| 431118 ||  || — || April 26, 2006 || Anderson Mesa || LONEOS || — || align=right | 2.1 km || 
|-id=119 bgcolor=#E9E9E9
| 431119 ||  || — || March 5, 2006 || Kitt Peak || Spacewatch || — || align=right | 2.2 km || 
|-id=120 bgcolor=#E9E9E9
| 431120 ||  || — || April 26, 2006 || Kitt Peak || Spacewatch || — || align=right | 2.9 km || 
|-id=121 bgcolor=#E9E9E9
| 431121 ||  || — || April 29, 2006 || Kitt Peak || Spacewatch || — || align=right | 2.2 km || 
|-id=122 bgcolor=#E9E9E9
| 431122 ||  || — || May 2, 2006 || Kitt Peak || Spacewatch || — || align=right | 1.9 km || 
|-id=123 bgcolor=#E9E9E9
| 431123 ||  || — || May 1, 2006 || Catalina || CSS || — || align=right | 3.2 km || 
|-id=124 bgcolor=#d6d6d6
| 431124 ||  || — || May 19, 2006 || Mount Lemmon || Mount Lemmon Survey || KOR || align=right | 1.4 km || 
|-id=125 bgcolor=#E9E9E9
| 431125 ||  || — || May 20, 2006 || Kitt Peak || Spacewatch || — || align=right | 2.6 km || 
|-id=126 bgcolor=#E9E9E9
| 431126 ||  || — || May 20, 2006 || Palomar || NEAT || — || align=right | 2.6 km || 
|-id=127 bgcolor=#d6d6d6
| 431127 ||  || — || May 20, 2006 || Kitt Peak || Spacewatch || — || align=right | 2.7 km || 
|-id=128 bgcolor=#E9E9E9
| 431128 ||  || — || May 22, 2006 || Kitt Peak || Spacewatch || — || align=right | 1.7 km || 
|-id=129 bgcolor=#E9E9E9
| 431129 ||  || — || May 20, 2006 || Mount Lemmon || Mount Lemmon Survey || AST || align=right | 1.6 km || 
|-id=130 bgcolor=#E9E9E9
| 431130 ||  || — || May 21, 2006 || Kitt Peak || Spacewatch || — || align=right | 2.1 km || 
|-id=131 bgcolor=#E9E9E9
| 431131 ||  || — || May 21, 2006 || Kitt Peak || Spacewatch || — || align=right | 2.0 km || 
|-id=132 bgcolor=#d6d6d6
| 431132 ||  || — || May 21, 2006 || Kitt Peak || Spacewatch || — || align=right | 3.1 km || 
|-id=133 bgcolor=#d6d6d6
| 431133 ||  || — || May 22, 2006 || Kitt Peak || Spacewatch || — || align=right | 2.6 km || 
|-id=134 bgcolor=#E9E9E9
| 431134 ||  || — || May 22, 2006 || Kitt Peak || Spacewatch || — || align=right | 2.2 km || 
|-id=135 bgcolor=#E9E9E9
| 431135 ||  || — || May 19, 2006 || Catalina || CSS || GEF || align=right | 1.5 km || 
|-id=136 bgcolor=#d6d6d6
| 431136 ||  || — || May 25, 2006 || Kitt Peak || Spacewatch || KOR || align=right | 1.2 km || 
|-id=137 bgcolor=#d6d6d6
| 431137 ||  || — || August 21, 2006 || Kitt Peak || Spacewatch || — || align=right | 3.1 km || 
|-id=138 bgcolor=#fefefe
| 431138 ||  || — || August 17, 2006 || Palomar || NEAT || — || align=right data-sort-value="0.57" | 570 m || 
|-id=139 bgcolor=#fefefe
| 431139 ||  || — || August 19, 2006 || Kitt Peak || Spacewatch || — || align=right data-sort-value="0.72" | 720 m || 
|-id=140 bgcolor=#d6d6d6
| 431140 ||  || — || August 19, 2006 || Kitt Peak || Spacewatch || EOS || align=right | 2.0 km || 
|-id=141 bgcolor=#fefefe
| 431141 ||  || — || August 19, 2006 || Anderson Mesa || LONEOS || — || align=right data-sort-value="0.91" | 910 m || 
|-id=142 bgcolor=#d6d6d6
| 431142 ||  || — || August 19, 2006 || Palomar || NEAT || — || align=right | 2.9 km || 
|-id=143 bgcolor=#d6d6d6
| 431143 ||  || — || August 19, 2006 || Kitt Peak || Spacewatch || — || align=right | 3.0 km || 
|-id=144 bgcolor=#d6d6d6
| 431144 ||  || — || August 21, 2006 || Kitt Peak || Spacewatch || — || align=right | 2.4 km || 
|-id=145 bgcolor=#FA8072
| 431145 ||  || — || August 27, 2006 || Kitt Peak || Spacewatch || — || align=right data-sort-value="0.57" | 570 m || 
|-id=146 bgcolor=#fefefe
| 431146 ||  || — || August 28, 2006 || Kitt Peak || Spacewatch || — || align=right data-sort-value="0.65" | 650 m || 
|-id=147 bgcolor=#d6d6d6
| 431147 ||  || — || August 27, 2006 || Anderson Mesa || LONEOS || — || align=right | 3.4 km || 
|-id=148 bgcolor=#FA8072
| 431148 ||  || — || August 21, 2006 || Socorro || LINEAR || — || align=right data-sort-value="0.75" | 750 m || 
|-id=149 bgcolor=#fefefe
| 431149 ||  || — || August 29, 2006 || Anderson Mesa || LONEOS || — || align=right data-sort-value="0.91" | 910 m || 
|-id=150 bgcolor=#d6d6d6
| 431150 ||  || — || August 19, 2006 || Kitt Peak || Spacewatch || — || align=right | 2.7 km || 
|-id=151 bgcolor=#d6d6d6
| 431151 ||  || — || August 19, 2006 || Kitt Peak || Spacewatch || — || align=right | 2.9 km || 
|-id=152 bgcolor=#d6d6d6
| 431152 ||  || — || August 19, 2006 || Kitt Peak || Spacewatch || — || align=right | 2.6 km || 
|-id=153 bgcolor=#d6d6d6
| 431153 ||  || — || August 20, 2006 || Kitt Peak || Spacewatch || — || align=right | 2.7 km || 
|-id=154 bgcolor=#fefefe
| 431154 ||  || — || August 29, 2006 || Catalina || CSS || — || align=right data-sort-value="0.67" | 670 m || 
|-id=155 bgcolor=#fefefe
| 431155 ||  || — || August 28, 2006 || Anderson Mesa || LONEOS || — || align=right data-sort-value="0.93" | 930 m || 
|-id=156 bgcolor=#d6d6d6
| 431156 ||  || — || August 27, 2006 || Kitt Peak || Spacewatch || — || align=right | 2.6 km || 
|-id=157 bgcolor=#d6d6d6
| 431157 ||  || — || August 19, 2006 || Kitt Peak || Spacewatch || — || align=right | 2.7 km || 
|-id=158 bgcolor=#d6d6d6
| 431158 ||  || — || September 11, 2006 || Bergisch Gladbach || W. Bickel || EOS || align=right | 2.3 km || 
|-id=159 bgcolor=#fefefe
| 431159 ||  || — || August 27, 2006 || Anderson Mesa || LONEOS || — || align=right data-sort-value="0.88" | 880 m || 
|-id=160 bgcolor=#d6d6d6
| 431160 ||  || — || September 14, 2006 || Kitt Peak || Spacewatch || — || align=right | 2.5 km || 
|-id=161 bgcolor=#d6d6d6
| 431161 ||  || — || September 14, 2006 || Kitt Peak || Spacewatch || EOS || align=right | 1.5 km || 
|-id=162 bgcolor=#d6d6d6
| 431162 ||  || — || September 15, 2006 || Socorro || LINEAR || — || align=right | 4.1 km || 
|-id=163 bgcolor=#d6d6d6
| 431163 ||  || — || September 14, 2006 || Kitt Peak || Spacewatch || — || align=right | 2.5 km || 
|-id=164 bgcolor=#fefefe
| 431164 ||  || — || September 14, 2006 || Kitt Peak || Spacewatch || — || align=right data-sort-value="0.65" | 650 m || 
|-id=165 bgcolor=#d6d6d6
| 431165 ||  || — || September 14, 2006 || Kitt Peak || Spacewatch || — || align=right | 3.3 km || 
|-id=166 bgcolor=#fefefe
| 431166 ||  || — || September 14, 2006 || Kitt Peak || Spacewatch || ERI || align=right | 1.4 km || 
|-id=167 bgcolor=#d6d6d6
| 431167 ||  || — || September 14, 2006 || Kitt Peak || Spacewatch || — || align=right | 3.0 km || 
|-id=168 bgcolor=#fefefe
| 431168 ||  || — || September 14, 2006 || Kitt Peak || Spacewatch || — || align=right data-sort-value="0.71" | 710 m || 
|-id=169 bgcolor=#fefefe
| 431169 ||  || — || September 15, 2006 || Kitt Peak || Spacewatch || — || align=right data-sort-value="0.67" | 670 m || 
|-id=170 bgcolor=#d6d6d6
| 431170 ||  || — || September 15, 2006 || Kitt Peak || Spacewatch || — || align=right | 2.4 km || 
|-id=171 bgcolor=#d6d6d6
| 431171 ||  || — || September 15, 2006 || Kitt Peak || Spacewatch || — || align=right | 2.5 km || 
|-id=172 bgcolor=#fefefe
| 431172 ||  || — || September 15, 2006 || Kitt Peak || Spacewatch || — || align=right data-sort-value="0.62" | 620 m || 
|-id=173 bgcolor=#d6d6d6
| 431173 ||  || — || September 15, 2006 || Kitt Peak || Spacewatch || — || align=right | 2.9 km || 
|-id=174 bgcolor=#fefefe
| 431174 ||  || — || September 15, 2006 || Kitt Peak || Spacewatch || — || align=right data-sort-value="0.78" | 780 m || 
|-id=175 bgcolor=#d6d6d6
| 431175 ||  || — || September 14, 2006 || Catalina || CSS || — || align=right | 3.0 km || 
|-id=176 bgcolor=#fefefe
| 431176 ||  || — || September 16, 2006 || Catalina || CSS || — || align=right data-sort-value="0.79" | 790 m || 
|-id=177 bgcolor=#FA8072
| 431177 ||  || — || August 28, 2006 || Anderson Mesa || LONEOS || — || align=right data-sort-value="0.71" | 710 m || 
|-id=178 bgcolor=#fefefe
| 431178 ||  || — || July 21, 2006 || Mount Lemmon || Mount Lemmon Survey || NYS || align=right data-sort-value="0.71" | 710 m || 
|-id=179 bgcolor=#d6d6d6
| 431179 ||  || — || September 18, 2006 || Kitt Peak || Spacewatch || — || align=right | 2.9 km || 
|-id=180 bgcolor=#fefefe
| 431180 ||  || — || September 18, 2006 || Catalina || CSS || MAS || align=right data-sort-value="0.66" | 660 m || 
|-id=181 bgcolor=#d6d6d6
| 431181 ||  || — || September 18, 2006 || Kitt Peak || Spacewatch || EOS || align=right | 1.7 km || 
|-id=182 bgcolor=#d6d6d6
| 431182 ||  || — || September 18, 2006 || Kitt Peak || Spacewatch || — || align=right | 2.7 km || 
|-id=183 bgcolor=#fefefe
| 431183 ||  || — || September 18, 2006 || Catalina || CSS || — || align=right data-sort-value="0.93" | 930 m || 
|-id=184 bgcolor=#fefefe
| 431184 ||  || — || August 19, 2006 || Anderson Mesa || LONEOS || — || align=right | 1.0 km || 
|-id=185 bgcolor=#d6d6d6
| 431185 ||  || — || September 18, 2006 || Anderson Mesa || LONEOS || — || align=right | 3.2 km || 
|-id=186 bgcolor=#d6d6d6
| 431186 ||  || — || September 19, 2006 || Kitt Peak || Spacewatch || — || align=right | 2.7 km || 
|-id=187 bgcolor=#fefefe
| 431187 ||  || — || September 19, 2006 || Kitt Peak || Spacewatch || — || align=right data-sort-value="0.77" | 770 m || 
|-id=188 bgcolor=#d6d6d6
| 431188 ||  || — || August 30, 2006 || Anderson Mesa || LONEOS || THB || align=right | 3.9 km || 
|-id=189 bgcolor=#d6d6d6
| 431189 ||  || — || September 18, 2006 || Kitt Peak || Spacewatch || — || align=right | 4.2 km || 
|-id=190 bgcolor=#fefefe
| 431190 ||  || — || September 18, 2006 || Kitt Peak || Spacewatch || — || align=right data-sort-value="0.81" | 810 m || 
|-id=191 bgcolor=#fefefe
| 431191 ||  || — || September 18, 2006 || Kitt Peak || Spacewatch || — || align=right data-sort-value="0.59" | 590 m || 
|-id=192 bgcolor=#d6d6d6
| 431192 ||  || — || September 18, 2006 || Kitt Peak || Spacewatch || — || align=right | 3.3 km || 
|-id=193 bgcolor=#fefefe
| 431193 ||  || — || September 18, 2006 || Kitt Peak || Spacewatch || — || align=right data-sort-value="0.64" | 640 m || 
|-id=194 bgcolor=#fefefe
| 431194 ||  || — || September 19, 2006 || Kitt Peak || Spacewatch || — || align=right data-sort-value="0.62" | 620 m || 
|-id=195 bgcolor=#d6d6d6
| 431195 ||  || — || September 19, 2006 || Catalina || CSS || — || align=right | 5.3 km || 
|-id=196 bgcolor=#d6d6d6
| 431196 ||  || — || September 19, 2006 || Catalina || CSS || — || align=right | 4.3 km || 
|-id=197 bgcolor=#fefefe
| 431197 ||  || — || September 24, 2006 || Kitt Peak || Spacewatch || NYS || align=right data-sort-value="0.48" | 480 m || 
|-id=198 bgcolor=#d6d6d6
| 431198 ||  || — || September 18, 2006 || Catalina || CSS || — || align=right | 3.0 km || 
|-id=199 bgcolor=#fefefe
| 431199 ||  || — || September 18, 2006 || Anderson Mesa || LONEOS || — || align=right data-sort-value="0.70" | 700 m || 
|-id=200 bgcolor=#d6d6d6
| 431200 ||  || — || September 20, 2006 || Catalina || CSS || — || align=right | 3.2 km || 
|}

431201–431300 

|-bgcolor=#d6d6d6
| 431201 ||  || — || September 20, 2006 || Catalina || CSS || — || align=right | 3.9 km || 
|-id=202 bgcolor=#fefefe
| 431202 ||  || — || September 19, 2006 || Kitt Peak || Spacewatch || — || align=right data-sort-value="0.76" | 760 m || 
|-id=203 bgcolor=#fefefe
| 431203 ||  || — || September 19, 2006 || Kitt Peak || Spacewatch || — || align=right data-sort-value="0.79" | 790 m || 
|-id=204 bgcolor=#d6d6d6
| 431204 ||  || — || September 20, 2006 || Catalina || CSS || — || align=right | 2.6 km || 
|-id=205 bgcolor=#fefefe
| 431205 ||  || — || September 15, 2006 || Kitt Peak || Spacewatch || — || align=right data-sort-value="0.65" | 650 m || 
|-id=206 bgcolor=#d6d6d6
| 431206 ||  || — || September 25, 2006 || Kitt Peak || Spacewatch || — || align=right | 3.2 km || 
|-id=207 bgcolor=#fefefe
| 431207 ||  || — || September 17, 2006 || Kitt Peak || Spacewatch || — || align=right data-sort-value="0.52" | 520 m || 
|-id=208 bgcolor=#fefefe
| 431208 ||  || — || September 25, 2006 || Kitt Peak || Spacewatch || — || align=right data-sort-value="0.85" | 850 m || 
|-id=209 bgcolor=#d6d6d6
| 431209 ||  || — || September 25, 2006 || Kitt Peak || Spacewatch || EOS || align=right | 1.6 km || 
|-id=210 bgcolor=#fefefe
| 431210 ||  || — || September 25, 2006 || Mount Lemmon || Mount Lemmon Survey || NYS || align=right data-sort-value="0.62" | 620 m || 
|-id=211 bgcolor=#d6d6d6
| 431211 ||  || — || September 18, 2006 || Kitt Peak || Spacewatch || — || align=right | 3.1 km || 
|-id=212 bgcolor=#d6d6d6
| 431212 ||  || — || September 25, 2006 || Kitt Peak || Spacewatch || — || align=right | 3.8 km || 
|-id=213 bgcolor=#fefefe
| 431213 ||  || — || September 27, 2006 || Kitt Peak || Spacewatch || — || align=right data-sort-value="0.69" | 690 m || 
|-id=214 bgcolor=#fefefe
| 431214 ||  || — || September 14, 2006 || Kitt Peak || Spacewatch || — || align=right data-sort-value="0.72" | 720 m || 
|-id=215 bgcolor=#d6d6d6
| 431215 ||  || — || September 26, 2006 || Kitt Peak || Spacewatch || — || align=right | 3.2 km || 
|-id=216 bgcolor=#d6d6d6
| 431216 ||  || — || September 26, 2006 || Kitt Peak || Spacewatch || — || align=right | 2.8 km || 
|-id=217 bgcolor=#d6d6d6
| 431217 ||  || — || September 18, 2006 || Kitt Peak || Spacewatch || HYG || align=right | 2.5 km || 
|-id=218 bgcolor=#fefefe
| 431218 ||  || — || September 26, 2006 || Kitt Peak || Spacewatch || — || align=right data-sort-value="0.67" | 670 m || 
|-id=219 bgcolor=#d6d6d6
| 431219 ||  || — || September 26, 2006 || Kitt Peak || Spacewatch || — || align=right | 2.6 km || 
|-id=220 bgcolor=#fefefe
| 431220 ||  || — || September 26, 2006 || Kitt Peak || Spacewatch || — || align=right data-sort-value="0.78" | 780 m || 
|-id=221 bgcolor=#fefefe
| 431221 ||  || — || September 26, 2006 || Kitt Peak || Spacewatch || — || align=right data-sort-value="0.69" | 690 m || 
|-id=222 bgcolor=#d6d6d6
| 431222 ||  || — || September 26, 2006 || Kitt Peak || Spacewatch || — || align=right | 2.8 km || 
|-id=223 bgcolor=#d6d6d6
| 431223 ||  || — || September 26, 2006 || Catalina || CSS || — || align=right | 3.4 km || 
|-id=224 bgcolor=#fefefe
| 431224 ||  || — || September 25, 2006 || Mount Lemmon || Mount Lemmon Survey || MAS || align=right data-sort-value="0.71" | 710 m || 
|-id=225 bgcolor=#fefefe
| 431225 ||  || — || September 26, 2006 || Kitt Peak || Spacewatch || — || align=right data-sort-value="0.75" | 750 m || 
|-id=226 bgcolor=#fefefe
| 431226 ||  || — || September 27, 2006 || Kitt Peak || Spacewatch || — || align=right data-sort-value="0.71" | 710 m || 
|-id=227 bgcolor=#d6d6d6
| 431227 ||  || — || September 17, 2006 || Kitt Peak || Spacewatch || — || align=right | 2.8 km || 
|-id=228 bgcolor=#d6d6d6
| 431228 ||  || — || September 19, 2006 || Kitt Peak || Spacewatch || — || align=right | 3.0 km || 
|-id=229 bgcolor=#d6d6d6
| 431229 ||  || — || September 27, 2006 || Kitt Peak || Spacewatch || — || align=right | 3.0 km || 
|-id=230 bgcolor=#d6d6d6
| 431230 ||  || — || September 28, 2006 || Kitt Peak || Spacewatch || — || align=right | 3.1 km || 
|-id=231 bgcolor=#fefefe
| 431231 ||  || — || September 30, 2006 || Mount Lemmon || Mount Lemmon Survey || — || align=right data-sort-value="0.87" | 870 m || 
|-id=232 bgcolor=#fefefe
| 431232 ||  || — || September 30, 2006 || Catalina || CSS || — || align=right data-sort-value="0.69" | 690 m || 
|-id=233 bgcolor=#d6d6d6
| 431233 ||  || — || September 17, 2006 || Apache Point || A. C. Becker || — || align=right | 2.6 km || 
|-id=234 bgcolor=#d6d6d6
| 431234 ||  || — || September 30, 2006 || Apache Point || A. C. Becker || — || align=right | 3.0 km || 
|-id=235 bgcolor=#d6d6d6
| 431235 ||  || — || September 30, 2006 || Apache Point || A. C. Becker || — || align=right | 3.1 km || 
|-id=236 bgcolor=#fefefe
| 431236 ||  || — || September 30, 2006 || Kitt Peak || Spacewatch || — || align=right data-sort-value="0.64" | 640 m || 
|-id=237 bgcolor=#d6d6d6
| 431237 ||  || — || September 18, 2006 || Catalina || CSS || — || align=right | 3.6 km || 
|-id=238 bgcolor=#d6d6d6
| 431238 ||  || — || September 26, 2006 || Mount Lemmon || Mount Lemmon Survey || — || align=right | 3.7 km || 
|-id=239 bgcolor=#d6d6d6
| 431239 ||  || — || October 11, 2006 || Kitt Peak || Spacewatch || — || align=right | 3.9 km || 
|-id=240 bgcolor=#fefefe
| 431240 ||  || — || October 11, 2006 || Kitt Peak || Spacewatch || MAS || align=right data-sort-value="0.76" | 760 m || 
|-id=241 bgcolor=#d6d6d6
| 431241 ||  || — || September 25, 2006 || Mount Lemmon || Mount Lemmon Survey || — || align=right | 3.2 km || 
|-id=242 bgcolor=#fefefe
| 431242 ||  || — || September 27, 2006 || Mount Lemmon || Mount Lemmon Survey || — || align=right data-sort-value="0.68" | 680 m || 
|-id=243 bgcolor=#d6d6d6
| 431243 ||  || — || October 12, 2006 || Kitt Peak || Spacewatch || — || align=right | 2.8 km || 
|-id=244 bgcolor=#d6d6d6
| 431244 ||  || — || October 12, 2006 || Kitt Peak || Spacewatch || THM || align=right | 2.6 km || 
|-id=245 bgcolor=#d6d6d6
| 431245 ||  || — || October 15, 2006 || Catalina || CSS || — || align=right | 5.0 km || 
|-id=246 bgcolor=#fefefe
| 431246 ||  || — || October 11, 2006 || Palomar || NEAT || — || align=right data-sort-value="0.62" | 620 m || 
|-id=247 bgcolor=#fefefe
| 431247 ||  || — || September 19, 2006 || Catalina || CSS || — || align=right data-sort-value="0.83" | 830 m || 
|-id=248 bgcolor=#fefefe
| 431248 ||  || — || October 4, 2006 || Mount Lemmon || Mount Lemmon Survey || — || align=right data-sort-value="0.69" | 690 m || 
|-id=249 bgcolor=#d6d6d6
| 431249 ||  || — || October 13, 2006 || Kitt Peak || Spacewatch || — || align=right | 4.1 km || 
|-id=250 bgcolor=#d6d6d6
| 431250 ||  || — || October 3, 2006 || Apache Point || A. C. Becker || — || align=right | 3.3 km || 
|-id=251 bgcolor=#d6d6d6
| 431251 ||  || — || October 12, 2006 || Apache Point || A. C. Becker || — || align=right | 2.9 km || 
|-id=252 bgcolor=#fefefe
| 431252 ||  || — || October 2, 2006 || Mount Lemmon || Mount Lemmon Survey || NYScritical || align=right data-sort-value="0.48" | 480 m || 
|-id=253 bgcolor=#fefefe
| 431253 ||  || — || September 17, 2006 || Kitt Peak || Spacewatch || NYS || align=right data-sort-value="0.44" | 440 m || 
|-id=254 bgcolor=#d6d6d6
| 431254 ||  || — || October 16, 2006 || Kitt Peak || Spacewatch || — || align=right | 2.8 km || 
|-id=255 bgcolor=#fefefe
| 431255 ||  || — || October 17, 2006 || Mount Lemmon || Mount Lemmon Survey || NYS || align=right data-sort-value="0.57" | 570 m || 
|-id=256 bgcolor=#fefefe
| 431256 ||  || — || October 17, 2006 || Mount Lemmon || Mount Lemmon Survey || MAS || align=right data-sort-value="0.67" | 670 m || 
|-id=257 bgcolor=#d6d6d6
| 431257 ||  || — || September 25, 2006 || Kitt Peak || Spacewatch || — || align=right | 3.0 km || 
|-id=258 bgcolor=#d6d6d6
| 431258 ||  || — || October 16, 2006 || Kitt Peak || Spacewatch || — || align=right | 3.6 km || 
|-id=259 bgcolor=#d6d6d6
| 431259 ||  || — || October 16, 2006 || Kitt Peak || Spacewatch || — || align=right | 3.5 km || 
|-id=260 bgcolor=#fefefe
| 431260 ||  || — || October 16, 2006 || Kitt Peak || Spacewatch || — || align=right data-sort-value="0.59" | 590 m || 
|-id=261 bgcolor=#fefefe
| 431261 ||  || — || October 3, 2006 || Mount Lemmon || Mount Lemmon Survey || — || align=right data-sort-value="0.71" | 710 m || 
|-id=262 bgcolor=#fefefe
| 431262 ||  || — || October 16, 2006 || Kitt Peak || Spacewatch || MAS || align=right data-sort-value="0.65" | 650 m || 
|-id=263 bgcolor=#d6d6d6
| 431263 ||  || — || October 16, 2006 || Kitt Peak || Spacewatch || — || align=right | 4.9 km || 
|-id=264 bgcolor=#d6d6d6
| 431264 ||  || — || September 17, 2006 || Catalina || CSS || — || align=right | 3.4 km || 
|-id=265 bgcolor=#d6d6d6
| 431265 ||  || — || October 19, 2006 || Mount Lemmon || Mount Lemmon Survey || — || align=right | 2.7 km || 
|-id=266 bgcolor=#d6d6d6
| 431266 ||  || — || October 16, 2006 || Kitt Peak || Spacewatch || — || align=right | 2.4 km || 
|-id=267 bgcolor=#d6d6d6
| 431267 ||  || — || September 23, 2006 || Kitt Peak || Spacewatch || — || align=right | 2.9 km || 
|-id=268 bgcolor=#d6d6d6
| 431268 ||  || — || October 17, 2006 || Kitt Peak || Spacewatch || — || align=right | 3.9 km || 
|-id=269 bgcolor=#fefefe
| 431269 ||  || — || September 25, 2006 || Mount Lemmon || Mount Lemmon Survey || — || align=right data-sort-value="0.83" | 830 m || 
|-id=270 bgcolor=#fefefe
| 431270 ||  || — || September 30, 2006 || Mount Lemmon || Mount Lemmon Survey || NYS || align=right data-sort-value="0.58" | 580 m || 
|-id=271 bgcolor=#d6d6d6
| 431271 ||  || — || October 18, 2006 || Kitt Peak || Spacewatch || — || align=right | 3.1 km || 
|-id=272 bgcolor=#d6d6d6
| 431272 ||  || — || October 2, 2006 || Mount Lemmon || Mount Lemmon Survey || — || align=right | 3.4 km || 
|-id=273 bgcolor=#fefefe
| 431273 ||  || — || October 18, 2006 || Kitt Peak || Spacewatch || — || align=right data-sort-value="0.67" | 670 m || 
|-id=274 bgcolor=#fefefe
| 431274 ||  || — || October 3, 2006 || Mount Lemmon || Mount Lemmon Survey || — || align=right data-sort-value="0.80" | 800 m || 
|-id=275 bgcolor=#d6d6d6
| 431275 ||  || — || September 28, 2006 || Kitt Peak || Spacewatch || — || align=right | 2.7 km || 
|-id=276 bgcolor=#d6d6d6
| 431276 ||  || — || October 2, 2006 || Kitt Peak || Spacewatch || VER || align=right | 2.7 km || 
|-id=277 bgcolor=#fefefe
| 431277 ||  || — || October 19, 2006 || Kitt Peak || Spacewatch || — || align=right data-sort-value="0.86" | 860 m || 
|-id=278 bgcolor=#d6d6d6
| 431278 ||  || — || October 19, 2006 || Kitt Peak || Spacewatch || EOS || align=right | 2.1 km || 
|-id=279 bgcolor=#d6d6d6
| 431279 ||  || — || October 19, 2006 || Kitt Peak || Spacewatch || THB || align=right | 4.4 km || 
|-id=280 bgcolor=#fefefe
| 431280 ||  || — || October 21, 2006 || Mount Lemmon || Mount Lemmon Survey || — || align=right data-sort-value="0.75" | 750 m || 
|-id=281 bgcolor=#d6d6d6
| 431281 ||  || — || October 21, 2006 || Mount Lemmon || Mount Lemmon Survey || — || align=right | 5.2 km || 
|-id=282 bgcolor=#d6d6d6
| 431282 ||  || — || September 16, 2006 || Anderson Mesa || LONEOS || — || align=right | 3.5 km || 
|-id=283 bgcolor=#d6d6d6
| 431283 ||  || — || October 20, 2006 || Kitt Peak || Spacewatch || — || align=right | 2.7 km || 
|-id=284 bgcolor=#d6d6d6
| 431284 ||  || — || October 22, 2006 || Catalina || CSS || — || align=right | 4.8 km || 
|-id=285 bgcolor=#fefefe
| 431285 ||  || — || October 23, 2006 || Kitt Peak || Spacewatch || — || align=right data-sort-value="0.83" | 830 m || 
|-id=286 bgcolor=#d6d6d6
| 431286 ||  || — || October 27, 2006 || Nyukasa || Mount Nyukasa Stn. || — || align=right | 3.6 km || 
|-id=287 bgcolor=#fefefe
| 431287 ||  || — || October 27, 2006 || Nyukasa || Mount Nyukasa Stn. || — || align=right data-sort-value="0.72" | 720 m || 
|-id=288 bgcolor=#fefefe
| 431288 ||  || — || October 2, 2006 || Mount Lemmon || Mount Lemmon Survey || — || align=right data-sort-value="0.68" | 680 m || 
|-id=289 bgcolor=#fefefe
| 431289 ||  || — || October 27, 2006 || Mount Lemmon || Mount Lemmon Survey || — || align=right data-sort-value="0.65" | 650 m || 
|-id=290 bgcolor=#fefefe
| 431290 ||  || — || October 27, 2006 || Mount Lemmon || Mount Lemmon Survey || — || align=right data-sort-value="0.62" | 620 m || 
|-id=291 bgcolor=#d6d6d6
| 431291 ||  || — || October 4, 2006 || Mount Lemmon || Mount Lemmon Survey || — || align=right | 3.1 km || 
|-id=292 bgcolor=#d6d6d6
| 431292 ||  || — || September 25, 2006 || Kitt Peak || Spacewatch || — || align=right | 3.1 km || 
|-id=293 bgcolor=#d6d6d6
| 431293 ||  || — || October 20, 2006 || Kitt Peak || Spacewatch || HYG || align=right | 3.2 km || 
|-id=294 bgcolor=#d6d6d6
| 431294 ||  || — || October 29, 2006 || Kitt Peak || Spacewatch || — || align=right | 3.7 km || 
|-id=295 bgcolor=#fefefe
| 431295 ||  || — || September 27, 2006 || Mount Lemmon || Mount Lemmon Survey || NYS || align=right data-sort-value="0.65" | 650 m || 
|-id=296 bgcolor=#fefefe
| 431296 ||  || — || October 23, 2006 || Mount Lemmon || Mount Lemmon Survey || — || align=right | 1.2 km || 
|-id=297 bgcolor=#d6d6d6
| 431297 ||  || — || October 16, 2006 || Apache Point || A. C. Becker || — || align=right | 3.4 km || 
|-id=298 bgcolor=#d6d6d6
| 431298 ||  || — || October 16, 2006 || Kitt Peak || Spacewatch || — || align=right | 2.4 km || 
|-id=299 bgcolor=#d6d6d6
| 431299 ||  || — || October 22, 2006 || Catalina || CSS || — || align=right | 3.7 km || 
|-id=300 bgcolor=#fefefe
| 431300 ||  || — || October 16, 2006 || Kitt Peak || Spacewatch || — || align=right data-sort-value="0.60" | 600 m || 
|}

431301–431400 

|-bgcolor=#fefefe
| 431301 ||  || — || November 7, 2006 || Palomar || NEAT || — || align=right data-sort-value="0.88" | 880 m || 
|-id=302 bgcolor=#d6d6d6
| 431302 ||  || — || October 31, 2006 || Mount Lemmon || Mount Lemmon Survey || — || align=right | 3.2 km || 
|-id=303 bgcolor=#fefefe
| 431303 ||  || — || November 11, 2006 || Kitt Peak || Spacewatch || NYS || align=right data-sort-value="0.54" | 540 m || 
|-id=304 bgcolor=#d6d6d6
| 431304 ||  || — || November 11, 2006 || Kitt Peak || Spacewatch || — || align=right | 2.5 km || 
|-id=305 bgcolor=#fefefe
| 431305 ||  || — || November 11, 2006 || Kitt Peak || Spacewatch || — || align=right data-sort-value="0.74" | 740 m || 
|-id=306 bgcolor=#d6d6d6
| 431306 ||  || — || November 11, 2006 || Kitt Peak || Spacewatch || Tj (2.98) || align=right | 4.1 km || 
|-id=307 bgcolor=#fefefe
| 431307 ||  || — || October 23, 2006 || Mount Lemmon || Mount Lemmon Survey || — || align=right data-sort-value="0.78" | 780 m || 
|-id=308 bgcolor=#fefefe
| 431308 ||  || — || October 22, 2006 || Mount Lemmon || Mount Lemmon Survey || — || align=right data-sort-value="0.66" | 660 m || 
|-id=309 bgcolor=#fefefe
| 431309 ||  || — || November 14, 2006 || Mount Lemmon || Mount Lemmon Survey || — || align=right data-sort-value="0.77" | 770 m || 
|-id=310 bgcolor=#d6d6d6
| 431310 ||  || — || October 31, 2006 || Mount Lemmon || Mount Lemmon Survey || — || align=right | 3.0 km || 
|-id=311 bgcolor=#fefefe
| 431311 ||  || — || November 15, 2006 || Kitt Peak || Spacewatch || — || align=right data-sort-value="0.80" | 800 m || 
|-id=312 bgcolor=#d6d6d6
| 431312 ||  || — || September 25, 2006 || Mount Lemmon || Mount Lemmon Survey || — || align=right | 3.3 km || 
|-id=313 bgcolor=#fefefe
| 431313 ||  || — || November 9, 2006 || Palomar || NEAT || — || align=right data-sort-value="0.88" | 880 m || 
|-id=314 bgcolor=#fefefe
| 431314 ||  || — || November 16, 2006 || Mount Lemmon || Mount Lemmon Survey || NYS || align=right data-sort-value="0.61" | 610 m || 
|-id=315 bgcolor=#d6d6d6
| 431315 ||  || — || May 20, 2004 || Campo Imperatore || CINEOS || — || align=right | 4.8 km || 
|-id=316 bgcolor=#fefefe
| 431316 ||  || — || November 16, 2006 || Kitt Peak || Spacewatch || MAS || align=right data-sort-value="0.72" | 720 m || 
|-id=317 bgcolor=#fefefe
| 431317 ||  || — || November 17, 2006 || Kitt Peak || Spacewatch || — || align=right data-sort-value="0.86" | 860 m || 
|-id=318 bgcolor=#fefefe
| 431318 ||  || — || September 30, 2006 || Mount Lemmon || Mount Lemmon Survey || NYS || align=right data-sort-value="0.53" | 530 m || 
|-id=319 bgcolor=#fefefe
| 431319 ||  || — || November 11, 2006 || Mount Lemmon || Mount Lemmon Survey || — || align=right data-sort-value="0.67" | 670 m || 
|-id=320 bgcolor=#d6d6d6
| 431320 ||  || — || October 23, 2006 || Mount Lemmon || Mount Lemmon Survey || — || align=right | 4.5 km || 
|-id=321 bgcolor=#FA8072
| 431321 ||  || — || November 25, 2006 || Kitt Peak || Spacewatch || — || align=right | 2.2 km || 
|-id=322 bgcolor=#d6d6d6
| 431322 ||  || — || November 18, 2006 || Kitt Peak || Spacewatch || 7:4 || align=right | 3.3 km || 
|-id=323 bgcolor=#fefefe
| 431323 ||  || — || November 18, 2006 || Mount Lemmon || Mount Lemmon Survey || — || align=right data-sort-value="0.76" | 760 m || 
|-id=324 bgcolor=#fefefe
| 431324 ||  || — || November 11, 2006 || Kitt Peak || Spacewatch || MAS || align=right data-sort-value="0.72" | 720 m || 
|-id=325 bgcolor=#fefefe
| 431325 ||  || — || November 20, 2006 || Kitt Peak || Spacewatch || — || align=right data-sort-value="0.76" | 760 m || 
|-id=326 bgcolor=#fefefe
| 431326 ||  || — || November 22, 2006 || Kitt Peak || Spacewatch || — || align=right data-sort-value="0.69" | 690 m || 
|-id=327 bgcolor=#d6d6d6
| 431327 ||  || — || November 23, 2006 || Mount Lemmon || Mount Lemmon Survey || — || align=right | 3.9 km || 
|-id=328 bgcolor=#d6d6d6
| 431328 ||  || — || October 31, 2006 || Mount Lemmon || Mount Lemmon Survey || — || align=right | 3.9 km || 
|-id=329 bgcolor=#fefefe
| 431329 ||  || — || December 9, 2006 || Kitt Peak || Spacewatch || NYS || align=right data-sort-value="0.56" | 560 m || 
|-id=330 bgcolor=#fefefe
| 431330 ||  || — || December 10, 2006 || Kitt Peak || Spacewatch || NYS || align=right data-sort-value="0.69" | 690 m || 
|-id=331 bgcolor=#fefefe
| 431331 ||  || — || December 1, 2006 || Mount Lemmon || Mount Lemmon Survey || — || align=right data-sort-value="0.95" | 950 m || 
|-id=332 bgcolor=#fefefe
| 431332 ||  || — || November 10, 2006 || Kitt Peak || Spacewatch || NYS || align=right data-sort-value="0.79" | 790 m || 
|-id=333 bgcolor=#fefefe
| 431333 ||  || — || November 22, 2006 || Kitt Peak || Spacewatch || — || align=right data-sort-value="0.82" | 820 m || 
|-id=334 bgcolor=#fefefe
| 431334 ||  || — || November 25, 2006 || Kitt Peak || Spacewatch || — || align=right data-sort-value="0.75" | 750 m || 
|-id=335 bgcolor=#fefefe
| 431335 ||  || — || September 27, 2006 || Mount Lemmon || Mount Lemmon Survey || — || align=right | 1.0 km || 
|-id=336 bgcolor=#d6d6d6
| 431336 ||  || — || December 13, 2006 || Mount Lemmon || Mount Lemmon Survey || Tj (2.93) || align=right | 5.7 km || 
|-id=337 bgcolor=#fefefe
| 431337 ||  || — || December 15, 2006 || Kitt Peak || Spacewatch || — || align=right data-sort-value="0.70" | 700 m || 
|-id=338 bgcolor=#fefefe
| 431338 ||  || — || December 1, 2006 || Mount Lemmon || Mount Lemmon Survey || MAS || align=right data-sort-value="0.72" | 720 m || 
|-id=339 bgcolor=#fefefe
| 431339 ||  || — || November 21, 2006 || Mount Lemmon || Mount Lemmon Survey || — || align=right data-sort-value="0.83" | 830 m || 
|-id=340 bgcolor=#fefefe
| 431340 ||  || — || November 28, 2006 || Socorro || LINEAR || — || align=right data-sort-value="0.72" | 720 m || 
|-id=341 bgcolor=#fefefe
| 431341 ||  || — || December 21, 2006 || Kitt Peak || Spacewatch || — || align=right data-sort-value="0.80" | 800 m || 
|-id=342 bgcolor=#E9E9E9
| 431342 ||  || — || January 8, 2007 || Mount Lemmon || Mount Lemmon Survey || — || align=right | 2.2 km || 
|-id=343 bgcolor=#fefefe
| 431343 ||  || — || December 25, 1998 || Kitt Peak || Spacewatch || — || align=right data-sort-value="0.89" | 890 m || 
|-id=344 bgcolor=#fefefe
| 431344 ||  || — || November 25, 2006 || Mount Lemmon || Mount Lemmon Survey || — || align=right data-sort-value="0.81" | 810 m || 
|-id=345 bgcolor=#fefefe
| 431345 ||  || — || January 27, 2007 || Catalina || CSS || H || align=right data-sort-value="0.91" | 910 m || 
|-id=346 bgcolor=#fefefe
| 431346 ||  || — || January 24, 2007 || Nyukasa || Mount Nyukasa Stn. || — || align=right | 1.0 km || 
|-id=347 bgcolor=#d6d6d6
| 431347 ||  || — || January 28, 2007 || Mount Lemmon || Mount Lemmon Survey || SHU3:2 || align=right | 5.4 km || 
|-id=348 bgcolor=#fefefe
| 431348 ||  || — || January 25, 2007 || Kitt Peak || Spacewatch || — || align=right data-sort-value="0.66" | 660 m || 
|-id=349 bgcolor=#fefefe
| 431349 ||  || — || January 28, 2007 || Kitt Peak || Spacewatch || — || align=right data-sort-value="0.69" | 690 m || 
|-id=350 bgcolor=#fefefe
| 431350 ||  || — || January 27, 2007 || Mount Lemmon || Mount Lemmon Survey || — || align=right data-sort-value="0.83" | 830 m || 
|-id=351 bgcolor=#fefefe
| 431351 ||  || — || January 27, 2007 || Kitt Peak || Spacewatch || — || align=right data-sort-value="0.88" | 880 m || 
|-id=352 bgcolor=#fefefe
| 431352 ||  || — || January 27, 2007 || Kitt Peak || Spacewatch || H || align=right data-sort-value="0.51" | 510 m || 
|-id=353 bgcolor=#fefefe
| 431353 ||  || — || January 27, 2007 || Mount Lemmon || Mount Lemmon Survey || — || align=right data-sort-value="0.67" | 670 m || 
|-id=354 bgcolor=#fefefe
| 431354 ||  || — || February 6, 2007 || Mount Lemmon || Mount Lemmon Survey || — || align=right data-sort-value="0.80" | 800 m || 
|-id=355 bgcolor=#d6d6d6
| 431355 ||  || — || February 10, 2007 || Mount Lemmon || Mount Lemmon Survey || SYL7:4 || align=right | 3.3 km || 
|-id=356 bgcolor=#fefefe
| 431356 ||  || — || February 8, 2007 || Kitt Peak || Spacewatch || H || align=right data-sort-value="0.60" | 600 m || 
|-id=357 bgcolor=#fefefe
| 431357 ||  || — || January 28, 2007 || Kitt Peak || Spacewatch || — || align=right data-sort-value="0.86" | 860 m || 
|-id=358 bgcolor=#E9E9E9
| 431358 ||  || — || February 21, 2007 || Kitt Peak || Spacewatch || — || align=right data-sort-value="0.91" | 910 m || 
|-id=359 bgcolor=#fefefe
| 431359 ||  || — || February 22, 2007 || Anderson Mesa || LONEOS || H || align=right | 1.0 km || 
|-id=360 bgcolor=#fefefe
| 431360 ||  || — || February 23, 2007 || Kitt Peak || Spacewatch || — || align=right | 1.1 km || 
|-id=361 bgcolor=#d6d6d6
| 431361 ||  || — || February 23, 2007 || Kitt Peak || Spacewatch || 3:2 || align=right | 3.8 km || 
|-id=362 bgcolor=#fefefe
| 431362 ||  || — || January 28, 2007 || Mount Lemmon || Mount Lemmon Survey || H || align=right data-sort-value="0.67" | 670 m || 
|-id=363 bgcolor=#E9E9E9
| 431363 ||  || — || January 27, 2007 || Mount Lemmon || Mount Lemmon Survey || — || align=right data-sort-value="0.79" | 790 m || 
|-id=364 bgcolor=#E9E9E9
| 431364 ||  || — || February 23, 2007 || Kitt Peak || Spacewatch || — || align=right data-sort-value="0.91" | 910 m || 
|-id=365 bgcolor=#fefefe
| 431365 ||  || — || February 23, 2007 || Kitt Peak || Spacewatch || — || align=right data-sort-value="0.74" | 740 m || 
|-id=366 bgcolor=#fefefe
| 431366 ||  || — || February 25, 2007 || Mount Lemmon || Mount Lemmon Survey || NYS || align=right data-sort-value="0.61" | 610 m || 
|-id=367 bgcolor=#fefefe
| 431367 ||  || — || February 25, 2007 || Mount Lemmon || Mount Lemmon Survey || H || align=right data-sort-value="0.65" | 650 m || 
|-id=368 bgcolor=#d6d6d6
| 431368 ||  || — || February 21, 2007 || Kitt Peak || M. W. Buie || 3:2 || align=right | 3.7 km || 
|-id=369 bgcolor=#d6d6d6
| 431369 ||  || — || November 1, 2005 || Mount Lemmon || Mount Lemmon Survey || 3:2 || align=right | 3.0 km || 
|-id=370 bgcolor=#fefefe
| 431370 ||  || — || March 9, 2007 || Kitt Peak || Spacewatch || — || align=right data-sort-value="0.82" | 820 m || 
|-id=371 bgcolor=#E9E9E9
| 431371 ||  || — || February 23, 2007 || Mount Lemmon || Mount Lemmon Survey || MAR || align=right | 1.1 km || 
|-id=372 bgcolor=#E9E9E9
| 431372 ||  || — || February 23, 2007 || Mount Lemmon || Mount Lemmon Survey || — || align=right | 1.1 km || 
|-id=373 bgcolor=#E9E9E9
| 431373 ||  || — || March 10, 2007 || Kitt Peak || Spacewatch || — || align=right | 1.00 km || 
|-id=374 bgcolor=#E9E9E9
| 431374 ||  || — || September 8, 2004 || Socorro || LINEAR || — || align=right | 2.3 km || 
|-id=375 bgcolor=#fefefe
| 431375 ||  || — || March 10, 2007 || Mount Lemmon || Mount Lemmon Survey || — || align=right data-sort-value="0.98" | 980 m || 
|-id=376 bgcolor=#E9E9E9
| 431376 ||  || — || March 10, 2007 || Mount Lemmon || Mount Lemmon Survey || — || align=right | 1.7 km || 
|-id=377 bgcolor=#E9E9E9
| 431377 ||  || — || March 11, 2007 || Kitt Peak || Spacewatch || — || align=right data-sort-value="0.79" | 790 m || 
|-id=378 bgcolor=#E9E9E9
| 431378 ||  || — || March 11, 2007 || Kitt Peak || Spacewatch || — || align=right | 1.00 km || 
|-id=379 bgcolor=#E9E9E9
| 431379 ||  || — || March 14, 2007 || Anderson Mesa || LONEOS || — || align=right | 1.0 km || 
|-id=380 bgcolor=#E9E9E9
| 431380 ||  || — || February 21, 2007 || Kitt Peak || Spacewatch || — || align=right data-sort-value="0.83" | 830 m || 
|-id=381 bgcolor=#E9E9E9
| 431381 ||  || — || March 10, 2007 || Kitt Peak || Spacewatch || — || align=right | 1.1 km || 
|-id=382 bgcolor=#fefefe
| 431382 ||  || — || March 12, 2007 || Mount Lemmon || Mount Lemmon Survey || V || align=right data-sort-value="0.65" | 650 m || 
|-id=383 bgcolor=#E9E9E9
| 431383 ||  || — || March 14, 2007 || Socorro || LINEAR || — || align=right data-sort-value="0.87" | 870 m || 
|-id=384 bgcolor=#E9E9E9
| 431384 ||  || — || March 14, 2007 || Kitt Peak || Spacewatch || — || align=right | 1.6 km || 
|-id=385 bgcolor=#E9E9E9
| 431385 ||  || — || March 14, 2007 || Mount Lemmon || Mount Lemmon Survey || — || align=right data-sort-value="0.82" | 820 m || 
|-id=386 bgcolor=#E9E9E9
| 431386 ||  || — || March 15, 2007 || Kitt Peak || Spacewatch || — || align=right data-sort-value="0.76" | 760 m || 
|-id=387 bgcolor=#fefefe
| 431387 ||  || — || March 12, 2007 || Kitt Peak || Spacewatch || H || align=right data-sort-value="0.90" | 900 m || 
|-id=388 bgcolor=#fefefe
| 431388 ||  || — || March 10, 2007 || Catalina || CSS || H || align=right data-sort-value="0.80" | 800 m || 
|-id=389 bgcolor=#fefefe
| 431389 ||  || — || March 10, 2007 || Catalina || CSS || H || align=right data-sort-value="0.93" | 930 m || 
|-id=390 bgcolor=#fefefe
| 431390 ||  || — || March 12, 2007 || Catalina || CSS || H || align=right data-sort-value="0.97" | 970 m || 
|-id=391 bgcolor=#fefefe
| 431391 ||  || — || December 16, 2006 || Mount Lemmon || Mount Lemmon Survey || H || align=right data-sort-value="0.77" | 770 m || 
|-id=392 bgcolor=#E9E9E9
| 431392 ||  || — || March 16, 2007 || Mount Lemmon || Mount Lemmon Survey || (5) || align=right | 1.1 km || 
|-id=393 bgcolor=#fefefe
| 431393 ||  || — || March 10, 2007 || Mount Lemmon || Mount Lemmon Survey || — || align=right data-sort-value="0.89" | 890 m || 
|-id=394 bgcolor=#FFC2E0
| 431394 ||  || — || March 20, 2007 || Kitt Peak || Spacewatch || AMO || align=right data-sort-value="0.47" | 470 m || 
|-id=395 bgcolor=#E9E9E9
| 431395 ||  || — || March 26, 2007 || Mount Lemmon || Mount Lemmon Survey || — || align=right | 2.0 km || 
|-id=396 bgcolor=#FA8072
| 431396 ||  || — || March 20, 2007 || Catalina || CSS || H || align=right data-sort-value="0.79" | 790 m || 
|-id=397 bgcolor=#E9E9E9
| 431397 Carolinregina ||  ||  || April 14, 2007 || Heidelberg || F. Hormuth || ADE || align=right | 1.6 km || 
|-id=398 bgcolor=#E9E9E9
| 431398 ||  || — || April 11, 2007 || Kitt Peak || Spacewatch || — || align=right data-sort-value="0.69" | 690 m || 
|-id=399 bgcolor=#E9E9E9
| 431399 ||  || — || February 26, 2007 || Mount Lemmon || Mount Lemmon Survey || — || align=right data-sort-value="0.84" | 840 m || 
|-id=400 bgcolor=#E9E9E9
| 431400 ||  || — || April 11, 2007 || Mount Lemmon || Mount Lemmon Survey || (5) || align=right data-sort-value="0.73" | 730 m || 
|}

431401–431500 

|-bgcolor=#E9E9E9
| 431401 ||  || — || March 26, 2007 || Mount Lemmon || Mount Lemmon Survey || KON || align=right | 1.7 km || 
|-id=402 bgcolor=#E9E9E9
| 431402 ||  || — || April 14, 2007 || Kitt Peak || Spacewatch || — || align=right | 1.1 km || 
|-id=403 bgcolor=#E9E9E9
| 431403 ||  || — || April 14, 2007 || Kitt Peak || Spacewatch || — || align=right | 1.2 km || 
|-id=404 bgcolor=#E9E9E9
| 431404 ||  || — || April 14, 2007 || Kitt Peak || Spacewatch || — || align=right | 1.5 km || 
|-id=405 bgcolor=#E9E9E9
| 431405 ||  || — || April 14, 2007 || Kitt Peak || Spacewatch || — || align=right | 2.1 km || 
|-id=406 bgcolor=#E9E9E9
| 431406 ||  || — || April 13, 2007 || Črni Vrh || Črni Vrh || — || align=right | 1.9 km || 
|-id=407 bgcolor=#E9E9E9
| 431407 ||  || — || April 15, 2007 || Kitt Peak || Spacewatch || — || align=right | 2.0 km || 
|-id=408 bgcolor=#E9E9E9
| 431408 ||  || — || April 15, 2007 || Kitt Peak || Spacewatch || — || align=right data-sort-value="0.84" | 840 m || 
|-id=409 bgcolor=#E9E9E9
| 431409 ||  || — || April 15, 2007 || Kitt Peak || Spacewatch || — || align=right | 1.1 km || 
|-id=410 bgcolor=#E9E9E9
| 431410 ||  || — || April 18, 2007 || Kitt Peak || Spacewatch || — || align=right data-sort-value="0.82" | 820 m || 
|-id=411 bgcolor=#E9E9E9
| 431411 ||  || — || April 20, 2007 || Kitt Peak || Spacewatch || — || align=right data-sort-value="0.95" | 950 m || 
|-id=412 bgcolor=#E9E9E9
| 431412 ||  || — || April 24, 2007 || Kitt Peak || Spacewatch || — || align=right data-sort-value="0.92" | 920 m || 
|-id=413 bgcolor=#E9E9E9
| 431413 ||  || — || March 14, 2007 || Mount Lemmon || Mount Lemmon Survey || — || align=right | 1.3 km || 
|-id=414 bgcolor=#E9E9E9
| 431414 ||  || — || April 23, 2007 || Kitt Peak || Spacewatch || — || align=right | 1.7 km || 
|-id=415 bgcolor=#E9E9E9
| 431415 ||  || — || April 24, 2007 || Kitt Peak || Spacewatch || — || align=right data-sort-value="0.87" | 870 m || 
|-id=416 bgcolor=#E9E9E9
| 431416 ||  || — || April 25, 2007 || Kitt Peak || Spacewatch || EUN || align=right | 1.1 km || 
|-id=417 bgcolor=#E9E9E9
| 431417 ||  || — || April 18, 2007 || Catalina || CSS || — || align=right | 1.3 km || 
|-id=418 bgcolor=#E9E9E9
| 431418 ||  || — || April 25, 2007 || Mount Lemmon || Mount Lemmon Survey || — || align=right | 1.8 km || 
|-id=419 bgcolor=#E9E9E9
| 431419 ||  || — || April 18, 2007 || Kitt Peak || Spacewatch || EUN || align=right | 1.0 km || 
|-id=420 bgcolor=#E9E9E9
| 431420 ||  || — || January 30, 2006 || Kitt Peak || Spacewatch || — || align=right | 1.3 km || 
|-id=421 bgcolor=#E9E9E9
| 431421 ||  || — || April 25, 2007 || Kitt Peak || Spacewatch || — || align=right | 1.1 km || 
|-id=422 bgcolor=#E9E9E9
| 431422 ||  || — || June 8, 2007 || Kitt Peak || Spacewatch || — || align=right | 1.8 km || 
|-id=423 bgcolor=#E9E9E9
| 431423 ||  || — || June 8, 2007 || Kitt Peak || Spacewatch || — || align=right | 1.5 km || 
|-id=424 bgcolor=#E9E9E9
| 431424 ||  || — || June 8, 2007 || Kitt Peak || Spacewatch || MAR || align=right | 1.2 km || 
|-id=425 bgcolor=#E9E9E9
| 431425 ||  || — || May 12, 2007 || Mount Lemmon || Mount Lemmon Survey || EUN || align=right | 1.5 km || 
|-id=426 bgcolor=#E9E9E9
| 431426 ||  || — || May 7, 2007 || Kitt Peak || Spacewatch || — || align=right | 1.8 km || 
|-id=427 bgcolor=#E9E9E9
| 431427 ||  || — || May 9, 2007 || Kitt Peak || Spacewatch || — || align=right | 1.9 km || 
|-id=428 bgcolor=#E9E9E9
| 431428 ||  || — || June 8, 2007 || Kitt Peak || Spacewatch || — || align=right | 1.4 km || 
|-id=429 bgcolor=#E9E9E9
| 431429 ||  || — || May 11, 2007 || Mount Lemmon || Mount Lemmon Survey || — || align=right | 1.5 km || 
|-id=430 bgcolor=#E9E9E9
| 431430 ||  || — || June 21, 2007 || Mount Lemmon || Mount Lemmon Survey || — || align=right | 1.7 km || 
|-id=431 bgcolor=#E9E9E9
| 431431 ||  || — || June 14, 2007 || Kitt Peak || Spacewatch || — || align=right | 2.2 km || 
|-id=432 bgcolor=#E9E9E9
| 431432 ||  || — || July 22, 2007 || Lulin Observatory || LUSS || — || align=right | 2.7 km || 
|-id=433 bgcolor=#E9E9E9
| 431433 ||  || — || August 12, 2007 || Socorro || LINEAR || JUN || align=right | 1.2 km || 
|-id=434 bgcolor=#fefefe
| 431434 ||  || — || August 12, 2007 || Socorro || LINEAR || — || align=right | 1.1 km || 
|-id=435 bgcolor=#E9E9E9
| 431435 ||  || — || August 11, 2007 || Socorro || LINEAR || — || align=right | 2.7 km || 
|-id=436 bgcolor=#E9E9E9
| 431436 Gahberg ||  ||  || August 18, 2007 || Gaisberg || R. Gierlinger || — || align=right | 1.7 km || 
|-id=437 bgcolor=#E9E9E9
| 431437 ||  || — || August 21, 2007 || Anderson Mesa || LONEOS || — || align=right | 2.8 km || 
|-id=438 bgcolor=#d6d6d6
| 431438 || 2007 RV || — || September 3, 2007 || Eskridge || G. Hug || EOS || align=right | 1.8 km || 
|-id=439 bgcolor=#E9E9E9
| 431439 ||  || — || August 13, 2007 || Socorro || LINEAR || JUN || align=right | 1.6 km || 
|-id=440 bgcolor=#d6d6d6
| 431440 ||  || — || September 4, 2007 || Catalina || CSS || — || align=right | 3.0 km || 
|-id=441 bgcolor=#d6d6d6
| 431441 ||  || — || September 9, 2007 || Mount Lemmon || Mount Lemmon Survey || EOS || align=right | 1.9 km || 
|-id=442 bgcolor=#d6d6d6
| 431442 ||  || — || September 9, 2007 || Mount Lemmon || Mount Lemmon Survey || — || align=right | 2.6 km || 
|-id=443 bgcolor=#d6d6d6
| 431443 ||  || — || September 9, 2007 || Kitt Peak || Spacewatch || EOS || align=right | 1.8 km || 
|-id=444 bgcolor=#d6d6d6
| 431444 ||  || — || September 10, 2007 || Mount Lemmon || Mount Lemmon Survey || — || align=right | 2.1 km || 
|-id=445 bgcolor=#d6d6d6
| 431445 ||  || — || March 14, 2004 || Kitt Peak || Spacewatch || — || align=right | 3.1 km || 
|-id=446 bgcolor=#d6d6d6
| 431446 ||  || — || September 12, 2007 || Mount Lemmon || Mount Lemmon Survey || EOS || align=right | 2.2 km || 
|-id=447 bgcolor=#E9E9E9
| 431447 ||  || — || September 13, 2007 || Socorro || LINEAR || — || align=right | 2.1 km || 
|-id=448 bgcolor=#d6d6d6
| 431448 ||  || — || September 13, 2007 || Socorro || LINEAR || — || align=right | 3.3 km || 
|-id=449 bgcolor=#E9E9E9
| 431449 ||  || — || April 8, 2006 || Kitt Peak || Spacewatch || — || align=right | 1.9 km || 
|-id=450 bgcolor=#d6d6d6
| 431450 ||  || — || September 10, 2007 || Kitt Peak || Spacewatch || — || align=right | 2.4 km || 
|-id=451 bgcolor=#d6d6d6
| 431451 ||  || — || September 9, 2007 || Mount Lemmon || Mount Lemmon Survey || KOR || align=right | 1.3 km || 
|-id=452 bgcolor=#d6d6d6
| 431452 ||  || — || September 13, 2007 || Kitt Peak || Spacewatch || — || align=right | 2.6 km || 
|-id=453 bgcolor=#d6d6d6
| 431453 ||  || — || September 13, 2007 || Kitt Peak || Spacewatch || — || align=right | 3.0 km || 
|-id=454 bgcolor=#d6d6d6
| 431454 ||  || — || September 13, 2007 || Kitt Peak || Spacewatch || — || align=right | 2.5 km || 
|-id=455 bgcolor=#d6d6d6
| 431455 ||  || — || September 10, 2007 || Kitt Peak || Spacewatch || — || align=right | 2.7 km || 
|-id=456 bgcolor=#fefefe
| 431456 ||  || — || September 12, 2007 || Dauban || Chante-Perdrix Obs. || — || align=right data-sort-value="0.69" | 690 m || 
|-id=457 bgcolor=#E9E9E9
| 431457 ||  || — || September 15, 2007 || Mount Lemmon || Mount Lemmon Survey || — || align=right | 1.9 km || 
|-id=458 bgcolor=#d6d6d6
| 431458 ||  || — || August 23, 2007 || Kitt Peak || Spacewatch || — || align=right | 3.4 km || 
|-id=459 bgcolor=#d6d6d6
| 431459 ||  || — || September 9, 2007 || Anderson Mesa || LONEOS || BRA || align=right | 1.9 km || 
|-id=460 bgcolor=#d6d6d6
| 431460 ||  || — || September 13, 2007 || Catalina || CSS || TIR || align=right | 2.5 km || 
|-id=461 bgcolor=#d6d6d6
| 431461 ||  || — || September 12, 2007 || Mount Lemmon || Mount Lemmon Survey || — || align=right | 2.3 km || 
|-id=462 bgcolor=#d6d6d6
| 431462 ||  || — || September 9, 2007 || Mount Lemmon || Mount Lemmon Survey || — || align=right | 2.4 km || 
|-id=463 bgcolor=#d6d6d6
| 431463 ||  || — || September 10, 2007 || Kitt Peak || Spacewatch || EOS || align=right | 1.4 km || 
|-id=464 bgcolor=#d6d6d6
| 431464 ||  || — || September 14, 2007 || Mount Lemmon || Mount Lemmon Survey || — || align=right | 3.6 km || 
|-id=465 bgcolor=#d6d6d6
| 431465 ||  || — || September 14, 2007 || Catalina || CSS || — || align=right | 3.9 km || 
|-id=466 bgcolor=#E9E9E9
| 431466 ||  || — || September 5, 2007 || Catalina || CSS || — || align=right | 2.7 km || 
|-id=467 bgcolor=#d6d6d6
| 431467 ||  || — || September 14, 2007 || Mount Lemmon || Mount Lemmon Survey || — || align=right | 2.3 km || 
|-id=468 bgcolor=#d6d6d6
| 431468 ||  || — || September 13, 2007 || Mount Lemmon || Mount Lemmon Survey || — || align=right | 3.4 km || 
|-id=469 bgcolor=#d6d6d6
| 431469 ||  || — || September 4, 2007 || Catalina || CSS || — || align=right | 3.1 km || 
|-id=470 bgcolor=#d6d6d6
| 431470 ||  || — || September 12, 2007 || Catalina || CSS || — || align=right | 2.9 km || 
|-id=471 bgcolor=#d6d6d6
| 431471 ||  || — || September 12, 2007 || Mount Lemmon || Mount Lemmon Survey || — || align=right | 2.6 km || 
|-id=472 bgcolor=#d6d6d6
| 431472 ||  || — || September 13, 2007 || Anderson Mesa || LONEOS || — || align=right | 3.1 km || 
|-id=473 bgcolor=#d6d6d6
| 431473 ||  || — || September 20, 2007 || Farra d'Isonzo || Farra d'Isonzo || — || align=right | 3.2 km || 
|-id=474 bgcolor=#E9E9E9
| 431474 ||  || — || September 9, 2007 || Kitt Peak || Spacewatch || — || align=right | 2.2 km || 
|-id=475 bgcolor=#d6d6d6
| 431475 ||  || — || September 18, 2007 || Catalina || CSS || — || align=right | 3.1 km || 
|-id=476 bgcolor=#E9E9E9
| 431476 ||  || — || March 26, 2006 || Mount Lemmon || Mount Lemmon Survey || — || align=right | 1.7 km || 
|-id=477 bgcolor=#d6d6d6
| 431477 ||  || — || October 6, 2007 || Bergisch Gladbac || W. Bickel || EOS || align=right | 1.6 km || 
|-id=478 bgcolor=#d6d6d6
| 431478 ||  || — || October 9, 2007 || Dauban || Chante-Perdrix Obs. || — || align=right | 2.9 km || 
|-id=479 bgcolor=#d6d6d6
| 431479 ||  || — || September 24, 2007 || Kitt Peak || Spacewatch || — || align=right | 2.7 km || 
|-id=480 bgcolor=#E9E9E9
| 431480 ||  || — || October 4, 2007 || Kitt Peak || Spacewatch || — || align=right | 2.7 km || 
|-id=481 bgcolor=#d6d6d6
| 431481 ||  || — || October 4, 2007 || Kitt Peak || Spacewatch || EOS || align=right | 2.0 km || 
|-id=482 bgcolor=#d6d6d6
| 431482 ||  || — || October 4, 2007 || Kitt Peak || Spacewatch || EOS || align=right | 1.7 km || 
|-id=483 bgcolor=#d6d6d6
| 431483 ||  || — || October 6, 2007 || Kitt Peak || Spacewatch || — || align=right | 3.5 km || 
|-id=484 bgcolor=#d6d6d6
| 431484 ||  || — || October 6, 2007 || Kitt Peak || Spacewatch || — || align=right | 2.6 km || 
|-id=485 bgcolor=#fefefe
| 431485 ||  || — || October 7, 2007 || Mount Lemmon || Mount Lemmon Survey || — || align=right data-sort-value="0.85" | 850 m || 
|-id=486 bgcolor=#d6d6d6
| 431486 ||  || — || October 4, 2007 || Kitt Peak || Spacewatch || — || align=right | 3.0 km || 
|-id=487 bgcolor=#d6d6d6
| 431487 ||  || — || October 4, 2007 || Kitt Peak || Spacewatch || EOS || align=right | 1.8 km || 
|-id=488 bgcolor=#d6d6d6
| 431488 ||  || — || October 4, 2007 || Kitt Peak || Spacewatch || EOS || align=right | 2.1 km || 
|-id=489 bgcolor=#d6d6d6
| 431489 ||  || — || April 7, 2005 || Kitt Peak || Spacewatch || — || align=right | 3.1 km || 
|-id=490 bgcolor=#d6d6d6
| 431490 ||  || — || October 7, 2007 || Mount Lemmon || Mount Lemmon Survey || — || align=right | 2.4 km || 
|-id=491 bgcolor=#d6d6d6
| 431491 ||  || — || October 7, 2007 || Mount Lemmon || Mount Lemmon Survey || — || align=right | 2.7 km || 
|-id=492 bgcolor=#d6d6d6
| 431492 ||  || — || October 12, 2007 || Goodricke-Pigott || R. A. Tucker || — || align=right | 3.7 km || 
|-id=493 bgcolor=#d6d6d6
| 431493 ||  || — || January 15, 2004 || Kitt Peak || Spacewatch || EOS || align=right | 2.2 km || 
|-id=494 bgcolor=#d6d6d6
| 431494 ||  || — || October 5, 2007 || Kitt Peak || Spacewatch || — || align=right | 2.9 km || 
|-id=495 bgcolor=#E9E9E9
| 431495 ||  || — || October 8, 2007 || Kitt Peak || Spacewatch || AGN || align=right | 1.3 km || 
|-id=496 bgcolor=#d6d6d6
| 431496 ||  || — || October 4, 2007 || Catalina || CSS || — || align=right | 2.4 km || 
|-id=497 bgcolor=#E9E9E9
| 431497 ||  || — || October 7, 2007 || Catalina || CSS || — || align=right | 3.8 km || 
|-id=498 bgcolor=#d6d6d6
| 431498 ||  || — || October 8, 2007 || Mount Lemmon || Mount Lemmon Survey || — || align=right | 2.8 km || 
|-id=499 bgcolor=#d6d6d6
| 431499 ||  || — || October 8, 2007 || Mount Lemmon || Mount Lemmon Survey || — || align=right | 2.0 km || 
|-id=500 bgcolor=#d6d6d6
| 431500 ||  || — || October 8, 2007 || Anderson Mesa || LONEOS || — || align=right | 3.4 km || 
|}

431501–431600 

|-bgcolor=#d6d6d6
| 431501 ||  || — || October 6, 2007 || Kitt Peak || Spacewatch || — || align=right | 2.5 km || 
|-id=502 bgcolor=#d6d6d6
| 431502 ||  || — || October 6, 2007 || Kitt Peak || Spacewatch || — || align=right | 2.6 km || 
|-id=503 bgcolor=#d6d6d6
| 431503 ||  || — || October 8, 2007 || Catalina || CSS || — || align=right | 3.6 km || 
|-id=504 bgcolor=#E9E9E9
| 431504 ||  || — || September 13, 2007 || Catalina || CSS || EUN || align=right | 1.5 km || 
|-id=505 bgcolor=#d6d6d6
| 431505 ||  || — || September 15, 2007 || Mount Lemmon || Mount Lemmon Survey || — || align=right | 3.9 km || 
|-id=506 bgcolor=#E9E9E9
| 431506 ||  || — || October 11, 2007 || Socorro || LINEAR || — || align=right | 2.6 km || 
|-id=507 bgcolor=#d6d6d6
| 431507 ||  || — || October 10, 2007 || Catalina || CSS || — || align=right | 3.7 km || 
|-id=508 bgcolor=#E9E9E9
| 431508 ||  || — || October 4, 2007 || Kitt Peak || Spacewatch || AGN || align=right | 1.3 km || 
|-id=509 bgcolor=#d6d6d6
| 431509 ||  || — || October 6, 2007 || Kitt Peak || Spacewatch || — || align=right | 2.5 km || 
|-id=510 bgcolor=#d6d6d6
| 431510 ||  || — || October 7, 2007 || Mount Lemmon || Mount Lemmon Survey || THM || align=right | 2.0 km || 
|-id=511 bgcolor=#d6d6d6
| 431511 ||  || — || October 7, 2007 || Mount Lemmon || Mount Lemmon Survey || — || align=right | 2.6 km || 
|-id=512 bgcolor=#fefefe
| 431512 ||  || — || October 9, 2007 || Mount Lemmon || Mount Lemmon Survey || — || align=right data-sort-value="0.50" | 500 m || 
|-id=513 bgcolor=#d6d6d6
| 431513 ||  || — || October 11, 2007 || Catalina || CSS || — || align=right | 3.7 km || 
|-id=514 bgcolor=#d6d6d6
| 431514 ||  || — || October 13, 2007 || Socorro || LINEAR || Tj (2.99) || align=right | 3.9 km || 
|-id=515 bgcolor=#d6d6d6
| 431515 ||  || — || October 13, 2007 || Socorro || LINEAR || — || align=right | 3.0 km || 
|-id=516 bgcolor=#d6d6d6
| 431516 ||  || — || October 11, 2007 || Kitt Peak || Spacewatch || — || align=right | 3.4 km || 
|-id=517 bgcolor=#d6d6d6
| 431517 ||  || — || October 5, 2007 || Kitt Peak || Spacewatch || EOS || align=right | 2.1 km || 
|-id=518 bgcolor=#fefefe
| 431518 ||  || — || October 7, 2007 || Mount Lemmon || Mount Lemmon Survey || — || align=right data-sort-value="0.66" | 660 m || 
|-id=519 bgcolor=#d6d6d6
| 431519 ||  || — || October 8, 2007 || Kitt Peak || Spacewatch || HYG || align=right | 2.3 km || 
|-id=520 bgcolor=#d6d6d6
| 431520 ||  || — || October 7, 2007 || Kitt Peak || Spacewatch || — || align=right | 2.8 km || 
|-id=521 bgcolor=#d6d6d6
| 431521 ||  || — || October 7, 2007 || Kitt Peak || Spacewatch || — || align=right | 3.7 km || 
|-id=522 bgcolor=#d6d6d6
| 431522 ||  || — || October 8, 2007 || Kitt Peak || Spacewatch || — || align=right | 2.2 km || 
|-id=523 bgcolor=#d6d6d6
| 431523 ||  || — || October 8, 2007 || Kitt Peak || Spacewatch || — || align=right | 3.2 km || 
|-id=524 bgcolor=#d6d6d6
| 431524 ||  || — || October 9, 2007 || Kitt Peak || Spacewatch || (1298) || align=right | 2.5 km || 
|-id=525 bgcolor=#d6d6d6
| 431525 ||  || — || October 10, 2007 || Kitt Peak || Spacewatch || — || align=right | 2.5 km || 
|-id=526 bgcolor=#fefefe
| 431526 ||  || — || October 9, 2007 || Kitt Peak || Spacewatch || — || align=right data-sort-value="0.67" | 670 m || 
|-id=527 bgcolor=#d6d6d6
| 431527 ||  || — || October 9, 2007 || Kitt Peak || Spacewatch || HYG || align=right | 2.7 km || 
|-id=528 bgcolor=#d6d6d6
| 431528 ||  || — || October 9, 2007 || Kitt Peak || Spacewatch || — || align=right | 3.0 km || 
|-id=529 bgcolor=#E9E9E9
| 431529 ||  || — || October 4, 2007 || Catalina || CSS || — || align=right | 2.7 km || 
|-id=530 bgcolor=#d6d6d6
| 431530 ||  || — || October 4, 2007 || Kitt Peak || Spacewatch || THM || align=right | 2.2 km || 
|-id=531 bgcolor=#d6d6d6
| 431531 ||  || — || October 8, 2007 || Mount Lemmon || Mount Lemmon Survey || HYG || align=right | 2.4 km || 
|-id=532 bgcolor=#d6d6d6
| 431532 ||  || — || September 15, 2007 || Mount Lemmon || Mount Lemmon Survey || — || align=right | 2.8 km || 
|-id=533 bgcolor=#d6d6d6
| 431533 ||  || — || September 25, 2007 || Mount Lemmon || Mount Lemmon Survey || — || align=right | 3.4 km || 
|-id=534 bgcolor=#d6d6d6
| 431534 ||  || — || October 10, 2007 || Mount Lemmon || Mount Lemmon Survey || — || align=right | 5.4 km || 
|-id=535 bgcolor=#d6d6d6
| 431535 ||  || — || October 10, 2007 || Mount Lemmon || Mount Lemmon Survey || — || align=right | 3.8 km || 
|-id=536 bgcolor=#d6d6d6
| 431536 ||  || — || October 12, 2007 || Catalina || CSS || — || align=right | 3.7 km || 
|-id=537 bgcolor=#d6d6d6
| 431537 ||  || — || October 6, 2007 || Kitt Peak || Spacewatch || — || align=right | 3.3 km || 
|-id=538 bgcolor=#d6d6d6
| 431538 ||  || — || October 14, 2007 || Kitt Peak || Spacewatch || — || align=right | 3.1 km || 
|-id=539 bgcolor=#d6d6d6
| 431539 ||  || — || September 15, 2007 || Mount Lemmon || Mount Lemmon Survey || EOS || align=right | 1.8 km || 
|-id=540 bgcolor=#d6d6d6
| 431540 ||  || — || October 14, 2007 || Kitt Peak || Spacewatch || — || align=right | 4.1 km || 
|-id=541 bgcolor=#d6d6d6
| 431541 ||  || — || October 15, 2007 || Kitt Peak || Spacewatch || EOS || align=right | 1.7 km || 
|-id=542 bgcolor=#d6d6d6
| 431542 ||  || — || October 15, 2007 || Kitt Peak || Spacewatch || EOS || align=right | 2.1 km || 
|-id=543 bgcolor=#d6d6d6
| 431543 ||  || — || October 10, 2007 || Kitt Peak || Spacewatch || — || align=right | 2.5 km || 
|-id=544 bgcolor=#d6d6d6
| 431544 ||  || — || October 7, 2007 || Catalina || CSS || — || align=right | 3.5 km || 
|-id=545 bgcolor=#d6d6d6
| 431545 ||  || — || October 8, 2007 || Mount Lemmon || Mount Lemmon Survey || — || align=right | 2.4 km || 
|-id=546 bgcolor=#d6d6d6
| 431546 ||  || — || October 10, 2007 || Catalina || CSS || — || align=right | 3.8 km || 
|-id=547 bgcolor=#d6d6d6
| 431547 ||  || — || October 10, 2007 || Catalina || CSS || — || align=right | 2.8 km || 
|-id=548 bgcolor=#d6d6d6
| 431548 ||  || — || October 8, 2007 || Catalina || CSS || — || align=right | 3.1 km || 
|-id=549 bgcolor=#d6d6d6
| 431549 ||  || — || October 10, 2007 || Catalina || CSS || — || align=right | 3.3 km || 
|-id=550 bgcolor=#d6d6d6
| 431550 ||  || — || October 9, 2007 || Catalina || CSS || TIR || align=right | 2.5 km || 
|-id=551 bgcolor=#d6d6d6
| 431551 ||  || — || October 9, 2007 || Kitt Peak || Spacewatch || EOS || align=right | 2.4 km || 
|-id=552 bgcolor=#fefefe
| 431552 ||  || — || October 9, 2007 || Kitt Peak || Spacewatch || — || align=right data-sort-value="0.87" | 870 m || 
|-id=553 bgcolor=#d6d6d6
| 431553 ||  || — || October 12, 2007 || Catalina || CSS || — || align=right | 3.4 km || 
|-id=554 bgcolor=#d6d6d6
| 431554 ||  || — || October 10, 2007 || Catalina || CSS || — || align=right | 2.9 km || 
|-id=555 bgcolor=#d6d6d6
| 431555 ||  || — || October 9, 2007 || Kitt Peak || Spacewatch || — || align=right | 3.1 km || 
|-id=556 bgcolor=#d6d6d6
| 431556 ||  || — || October 10, 2007 || Kitt Peak || Spacewatch || KOR || align=right | 1.3 km || 
|-id=557 bgcolor=#d6d6d6
| 431557 ||  || — || October 10, 2007 || Mount Lemmon || Mount Lemmon Survey || — || align=right | 2.8 km || 
|-id=558 bgcolor=#E9E9E9
| 431558 ||  || — || October 16, 2007 || Mount Lemmon || Mount Lemmon Survey || — || align=right | 2.8 km || 
|-id=559 bgcolor=#d6d6d6
| 431559 ||  || — || October 20, 2007 || Mount Lemmon || Mount Lemmon Survey || — || align=right | 2.8 km || 
|-id=560 bgcolor=#d6d6d6
| 431560 ||  || — || October 20, 2007 || Catalina || CSS || — || align=right | 3.1 km || 
|-id=561 bgcolor=#d6d6d6
| 431561 ||  || — || October 7, 2007 || Kitt Peak || Spacewatch || — || align=right | 2.5 km || 
|-id=562 bgcolor=#d6d6d6
| 431562 ||  || — || September 25, 2007 || Mount Lemmon || Mount Lemmon Survey || EOS || align=right | 2.0 km || 
|-id=563 bgcolor=#d6d6d6
| 431563 ||  || — || October 18, 2007 || Mount Lemmon || Mount Lemmon Survey || — || align=right | 2.5 km || 
|-id=564 bgcolor=#d6d6d6
| 431564 ||  || — || October 11, 2007 || Kitt Peak || Spacewatch || — || align=right | 3.3 km || 
|-id=565 bgcolor=#d6d6d6
| 431565 ||  || — || October 31, 2007 || Mount Lemmon || Mount Lemmon Survey || — || align=right | 2.7 km || 
|-id=566 bgcolor=#d6d6d6
| 431566 ||  || — || October 30, 2007 || Mount Lemmon || Mount Lemmon Survey || — || align=right | 2.9 km || 
|-id=567 bgcolor=#d6d6d6
| 431567 ||  || — || September 18, 2007 || Mount Lemmon || Mount Lemmon Survey || — || align=right | 2.6 km || 
|-id=568 bgcolor=#fefefe
| 431568 ||  || — || October 30, 2007 || Kitt Peak || Spacewatch || — || align=right data-sort-value="0.61" | 610 m || 
|-id=569 bgcolor=#d6d6d6
| 431569 ||  || — || October 30, 2007 || Mount Lemmon || Mount Lemmon Survey || — || align=right | 4.4 km || 
|-id=570 bgcolor=#d6d6d6
| 431570 ||  || — || October 31, 2007 || Kitt Peak || Spacewatch || — || align=right | 2.1 km || 
|-id=571 bgcolor=#fefefe
| 431571 ||  || — || October 16, 2007 || Mount Lemmon || Mount Lemmon Survey || — || align=right data-sort-value="0.51" | 510 m || 
|-id=572 bgcolor=#d6d6d6
| 431572 ||  || — || October 20, 2007 || Mount Lemmon || Mount Lemmon Survey || — || align=right | 3.7 km || 
|-id=573 bgcolor=#d6d6d6
| 431573 ||  || — || October 20, 2007 || Kitt Peak || Spacewatch || — || align=right | 3.1 km || 
|-id=574 bgcolor=#d6d6d6
| 431574 ||  || — || November 1, 2007 || Kitt Peak || Spacewatch || — || align=right | 3.0 km || 
|-id=575 bgcolor=#fefefe
| 431575 ||  || — || November 4, 2007 || La Sagra || OAM Obs. || — || align=right data-sort-value="0.92" | 920 m || 
|-id=576 bgcolor=#d6d6d6
| 431576 ||  || — || November 2, 2007 || Mount Lemmon || Mount Lemmon Survey || — || align=right | 3.4 km || 
|-id=577 bgcolor=#d6d6d6
| 431577 ||  || — || November 2, 2007 || Mount Lemmon || Mount Lemmon Survey || — || align=right | 3.1 km || 
|-id=578 bgcolor=#d6d6d6
| 431578 ||  || — || November 2, 2007 || Kitt Peak || Spacewatch || — || align=right | 2.7 km || 
|-id=579 bgcolor=#d6d6d6
| 431579 ||  || — || November 2, 2007 || Kitt Peak || Spacewatch || — || align=right | 3.2 km || 
|-id=580 bgcolor=#d6d6d6
| 431580 ||  || — || November 1, 2007 || Kitt Peak || Spacewatch || — || align=right | 3.4 km || 
|-id=581 bgcolor=#d6d6d6
| 431581 ||  || — || November 1, 2007 || Kitt Peak || Spacewatch || VER || align=right | 2.8 km || 
|-id=582 bgcolor=#d6d6d6
| 431582 ||  || — || November 1, 2007 || Kitt Peak || Spacewatch || — || align=right | 3.3 km || 
|-id=583 bgcolor=#d6d6d6
| 431583 ||  || — || November 1, 2007 || Kitt Peak || Spacewatch || — || align=right | 3.3 km || 
|-id=584 bgcolor=#d6d6d6
| 431584 ||  || — || November 1, 2007 || Kitt Peak || Spacewatch || — || align=right | 3.6 km || 
|-id=585 bgcolor=#d6d6d6
| 431585 ||  || — || November 2, 2007 || Kitt Peak || Spacewatch || — || align=right | 2.8 km || 
|-id=586 bgcolor=#d6d6d6
| 431586 ||  || — || October 10, 2007 || Catalina || CSS || — || align=right | 2.4 km || 
|-id=587 bgcolor=#d6d6d6
| 431587 ||  || — || November 3, 2007 || Kitt Peak || Spacewatch || — || align=right | 2.4 km || 
|-id=588 bgcolor=#d6d6d6
| 431588 ||  || — || October 10, 2007 || Mount Lemmon || Mount Lemmon Survey || — || align=right | 2.4 km || 
|-id=589 bgcolor=#d6d6d6
| 431589 ||  || — || October 20, 2007 || Mount Lemmon || Mount Lemmon Survey || — || align=right | 2.7 km || 
|-id=590 bgcolor=#d6d6d6
| 431590 ||  || — || November 5, 2007 || Kitt Peak || Spacewatch || — || align=right | 2.7 km || 
|-id=591 bgcolor=#d6d6d6
| 431591 ||  || — || October 6, 2007 || Kitt Peak || Spacewatch || EOS || align=right | 2.1 km || 
|-id=592 bgcolor=#d6d6d6
| 431592 ||  || — || November 5, 2007 || Kitt Peak || Spacewatch || — || align=right | 2.4 km || 
|-id=593 bgcolor=#d6d6d6
| 431593 ||  || — || November 5, 2007 || Kitt Peak || Spacewatch || VER || align=right | 3.1 km || 
|-id=594 bgcolor=#d6d6d6
| 431594 ||  || — || November 5, 2007 || Kitt Peak || Spacewatch || — || align=right | 3.6 km || 
|-id=595 bgcolor=#d6d6d6
| 431595 ||  || — || November 7, 2007 || Kitt Peak || Spacewatch || EOS || align=right | 2.5 km || 
|-id=596 bgcolor=#d6d6d6
| 431596 ||  || — || November 2, 2007 || Socorro || LINEAR || — || align=right | 3.2 km || 
|-id=597 bgcolor=#fefefe
| 431597 ||  || — || October 14, 2007 || Mount Lemmon || Mount Lemmon Survey || — || align=right data-sort-value="0.79" | 790 m || 
|-id=598 bgcolor=#d6d6d6
| 431598 ||  || — || November 9, 2007 || Bisei SG Center || BATTeRS || — || align=right | 2.6 km || 
|-id=599 bgcolor=#d6d6d6
| 431599 ||  || — || November 14, 2007 || La Sagra || OAM Obs. || URS || align=right | 5.1 km || 
|-id=600 bgcolor=#d6d6d6
| 431600 ||  || — || November 4, 2007 || Kitt Peak || Spacewatch || EOS || align=right | 1.9 km || 
|}

431601–431700 

|-bgcolor=#d6d6d6
| 431601 ||  || — || November 6, 2007 || Kitt Peak || Spacewatch || — || align=right | 2.8 km || 
|-id=602 bgcolor=#d6d6d6
| 431602 ||  || — || November 9, 2007 || Kitt Peak || Spacewatch || — || align=right | 2.7 km || 
|-id=603 bgcolor=#d6d6d6
| 431603 ||  || — || November 9, 2007 || Kitt Peak || Spacewatch || — || align=right | 2.9 km || 
|-id=604 bgcolor=#d6d6d6
| 431604 ||  || — || November 9, 2007 || Kitt Peak || Spacewatch || — || align=right | 3.6 km || 
|-id=605 bgcolor=#d6d6d6
| 431605 ||  || — || November 7, 2007 || Kitt Peak || Spacewatch || EOS || align=right | 2.3 km || 
|-id=606 bgcolor=#d6d6d6
| 431606 ||  || — || November 8, 2007 || Kitt Peak || Spacewatch || — || align=right | 3.1 km || 
|-id=607 bgcolor=#fefefe
| 431607 ||  || — || November 13, 2007 || Kitt Peak || Spacewatch || — || align=right data-sort-value="0.57" | 570 m || 
|-id=608 bgcolor=#d6d6d6
| 431608 ||  || — || November 13, 2007 || Mount Lemmon || Mount Lemmon Survey || — || align=right | 2.5 km || 
|-id=609 bgcolor=#d6d6d6
| 431609 ||  || — || November 13, 2007 || Mount Lemmon || Mount Lemmon Survey || EOS || align=right | 1.9 km || 
|-id=610 bgcolor=#d6d6d6
| 431610 ||  || — || March 10, 2005 || Kitt Peak || Spacewatch || — || align=right | 2.7 km || 
|-id=611 bgcolor=#d6d6d6
| 431611 ||  || — || October 10, 2007 || Kitt Peak || Spacewatch || — || align=right | 2.6 km || 
|-id=612 bgcolor=#d6d6d6
| 431612 ||  || — || October 20, 2007 || Mount Lemmon || Mount Lemmon Survey || BRA || align=right | 1.4 km || 
|-id=613 bgcolor=#d6d6d6
| 431613 ||  || — || November 12, 2007 || Catalina || CSS || — || align=right | 3.4 km || 
|-id=614 bgcolor=#d6d6d6
| 431614 ||  || — || November 4, 2007 || Kitt Peak || Spacewatch || EOS || align=right | 2.0 km || 
|-id=615 bgcolor=#d6d6d6
| 431615 ||  || — || October 30, 2007 || Kitt Peak || Spacewatch || — || align=right | 3.3 km || 
|-id=616 bgcolor=#d6d6d6
| 431616 ||  || — || November 14, 2007 || Kitt Peak || Spacewatch || — || align=right | 3.1 km || 
|-id=617 bgcolor=#fefefe
| 431617 ||  || — || November 5, 2007 || Kitt Peak || Spacewatch || — || align=right data-sort-value="0.56" | 560 m || 
|-id=618 bgcolor=#fefefe
| 431618 ||  || — || November 3, 2007 || Mount Lemmon || Mount Lemmon Survey || — || align=right data-sort-value="0.82" | 820 m || 
|-id=619 bgcolor=#d6d6d6
| 431619 ||  || — || November 5, 2007 || Kitt Peak || Spacewatch || — || align=right | 2.6 km || 
|-id=620 bgcolor=#d6d6d6
| 431620 ||  || — || November 9, 2007 || Mount Lemmon || Mount Lemmon Survey || — || align=right | 2.4 km || 
|-id=621 bgcolor=#d6d6d6
| 431621 ||  || — || November 12, 2007 || Mount Lemmon || Mount Lemmon Survey || — || align=right | 2.7 km || 
|-id=622 bgcolor=#d6d6d6
| 431622 ||  || — || November 8, 2007 || Catalina || CSS || — || align=right | 3.6 km || 
|-id=623 bgcolor=#d6d6d6
| 431623 ||  || — || November 8, 2007 || Socorro || LINEAR || — || align=right | 3.6 km || 
|-id=624 bgcolor=#d6d6d6
| 431624 ||  || — || October 21, 2007 || Catalina || CSS || — || align=right | 3.5 km || 
|-id=625 bgcolor=#FA8072
| 431625 ||  || — || November 18, 2007 || Wrightwood || J. W. Young || — || align=right data-sort-value="0.42" | 420 m || 
|-id=626 bgcolor=#d6d6d6
| 431626 ||  || — || November 1, 2007 || Kitt Peak || Spacewatch || EOS || align=right | 1.9 km || 
|-id=627 bgcolor=#fefefe
| 431627 ||  || — || October 18, 2007 || Kitt Peak || Spacewatch || — || align=right data-sort-value="0.51" | 510 m || 
|-id=628 bgcolor=#d6d6d6
| 431628 ||  || — || November 18, 2007 || Mount Lemmon || Mount Lemmon Survey || — || align=right | 3.2 km || 
|-id=629 bgcolor=#d6d6d6
| 431629 ||  || — || November 2, 2007 || Kitt Peak || Spacewatch || — || align=right | 2.6 km || 
|-id=630 bgcolor=#d6d6d6
| 431630 ||  || — || November 2, 2007 || Kitt Peak || Spacewatch || — || align=right | 2.9 km || 
|-id=631 bgcolor=#d6d6d6
| 431631 ||  || — || November 20, 2007 || Mount Lemmon || Mount Lemmon Survey || — || align=right | 3.4 km || 
|-id=632 bgcolor=#d6d6d6
| 431632 ||  || — || November 20, 2007 || Mount Lemmon || Mount Lemmon Survey || — || align=right | 3.6 km || 
|-id=633 bgcolor=#d6d6d6
| 431633 ||  || — || December 3, 2007 || Catalina || CSS || — || align=right | 3.4 km || 
|-id=634 bgcolor=#d6d6d6
| 431634 ||  || — || December 4, 2007 || Kitt Peak || Spacewatch || — || align=right | 2.9 km || 
|-id=635 bgcolor=#d6d6d6
| 431635 ||  || — || September 10, 2007 || Mount Lemmon || Mount Lemmon Survey || — || align=right | 3.1 km || 
|-id=636 bgcolor=#fefefe
| 431636 ||  || — || December 30, 2007 || Kitt Peak || Spacewatch || — || align=right data-sort-value="0.67" | 670 m || 
|-id=637 bgcolor=#fefefe
| 431637 ||  || — || December 30, 2007 || Mount Lemmon || Mount Lemmon Survey || — || align=right data-sort-value="0.89" | 890 m || 
|-id=638 bgcolor=#fefefe
| 431638 ||  || — || November 13, 2007 || Mount Lemmon || Mount Lemmon Survey || — || align=right data-sort-value="0.61" | 610 m || 
|-id=639 bgcolor=#d6d6d6
| 431639 ||  || — || January 10, 2008 || Mount Lemmon || Mount Lemmon Survey || — || align=right | 3.4 km || 
|-id=640 bgcolor=#fefefe
| 431640 ||  || — || January 10, 2008 || Kitt Peak || Spacewatch || — || align=right data-sort-value="0.58" | 580 m || 
|-id=641 bgcolor=#fefefe
| 431641 ||  || — || January 10, 2008 || Mount Lemmon || Mount Lemmon Survey || V || align=right data-sort-value="0.53" | 530 m || 
|-id=642 bgcolor=#fefefe
| 431642 ||  || — || January 10, 2008 || Kitt Peak || Spacewatch || — || align=right data-sort-value="0.49" | 490 m || 
|-id=643 bgcolor=#fefefe
| 431643 ||  || — || January 10, 2008 || Kitt Peak || Spacewatch || — || align=right data-sort-value="0.62" | 620 m || 
|-id=644 bgcolor=#d6d6d6
| 431644 ||  || — || January 11, 2008 || Mount Lemmon || Mount Lemmon Survey || — || align=right | 4.2 km || 
|-id=645 bgcolor=#fefefe
| 431645 ||  || — || December 28, 2007 || Kitt Peak || Spacewatch || — || align=right data-sort-value="0.69" | 690 m || 
|-id=646 bgcolor=#d6d6d6
| 431646 ||  || — || January 14, 2008 || Kitt Peak || Spacewatch || SYL7:4 || align=right | 3.7 km || 
|-id=647 bgcolor=#fefefe
| 431647 ||  || — || April 10, 2005 || Mount Lemmon || Mount Lemmon Survey || — || align=right data-sort-value="0.61" | 610 m || 
|-id=648 bgcolor=#fefefe
| 431648 ||  || — || January 11, 2008 || Kitt Peak || Spacewatch || critical || align=right data-sort-value="0.57" | 570 m || 
|-id=649 bgcolor=#fefefe
| 431649 ||  || — || January 16, 2008 || Kitt Peak || Spacewatch || — || align=right data-sort-value="0.66" | 660 m || 
|-id=650 bgcolor=#fefefe
| 431650 ||  || — || January 29, 2008 || La Sagra || OAM Obs. || — || align=right data-sort-value="0.79" | 790 m || 
|-id=651 bgcolor=#fefefe
| 431651 ||  || — || January 30, 2008 || Mount Lemmon || Mount Lemmon Survey || — || align=right data-sort-value="0.71" | 710 m || 
|-id=652 bgcolor=#fefefe
| 431652 ||  || — || January 30, 2008 || Mount Lemmon || Mount Lemmon Survey || — || align=right data-sort-value="0.68" | 680 m || 
|-id=653 bgcolor=#fefefe
| 431653 ||  || — || January 30, 2008 || Catalina || CSS || — || align=right data-sort-value="0.87" | 870 m || 
|-id=654 bgcolor=#fefefe
| 431654 ||  || — || January 30, 2008 || Mount Lemmon || Mount Lemmon Survey || — || align=right data-sort-value="0.83" | 830 m || 
|-id=655 bgcolor=#fefefe
| 431655 ||  || — || January 19, 2008 || Mount Lemmon || Mount Lemmon Survey || — || align=right data-sort-value="0.71" | 710 m || 
|-id=656 bgcolor=#fefefe
| 431656 ||  || — || January 18, 2008 || Catalina || CSS || — || align=right | 1.0 km || 
|-id=657 bgcolor=#fefefe
| 431657 ||  || — || January 11, 2008 || Kitt Peak || Spacewatch || critical || align=right data-sort-value="0.57" | 570 m || 
|-id=658 bgcolor=#fefefe
| 431658 ||  || — || December 19, 2007 || Mount Lemmon || Mount Lemmon Survey || — || align=right data-sort-value="0.77" | 770 m || 
|-id=659 bgcolor=#fefefe
| 431659 ||  || — || February 1, 2008 || Kitt Peak || Spacewatch || — || align=right data-sort-value="0.82" | 820 m || 
|-id=660 bgcolor=#d6d6d6
| 431660 ||  || — || February 2, 2008 || Kitt Peak || Spacewatch || 7:4 || align=right | 3.3 km || 
|-id=661 bgcolor=#fefefe
| 431661 ||  || — || February 2, 2008 || Kitt Peak || Spacewatch || — || align=right data-sort-value="0.81" | 810 m || 
|-id=662 bgcolor=#fefefe
| 431662 ||  || — || February 2, 2008 || Kitt Peak || Spacewatch || — || align=right data-sort-value="0.70" | 700 m || 
|-id=663 bgcolor=#fefefe
| 431663 ||  || — || February 7, 2008 || Kitt Peak || Spacewatch || NYS || align=right data-sort-value="0.44" | 440 m || 
|-id=664 bgcolor=#fefefe
| 431664 ||  || — || February 3, 2008 || Kitt Peak || Spacewatch || — || align=right data-sort-value="0.71" | 710 m || 
|-id=665 bgcolor=#fefefe
| 431665 ||  || — || February 3, 2008 || Kitt Peak || Spacewatch || — || align=right data-sort-value="0.87" | 870 m || 
|-id=666 bgcolor=#fefefe
| 431666 ||  || — || February 8, 2008 || Kitt Peak || Spacewatch || — || align=right data-sort-value="0.69" | 690 m || 
|-id=667 bgcolor=#fefefe
| 431667 ||  || — || February 9, 2008 || Kitt Peak || Spacewatch || — || align=right data-sort-value="0.79" | 790 m || 
|-id=668 bgcolor=#fefefe
| 431668 ||  || — || February 2, 2008 || Kitt Peak || Spacewatch || — || align=right data-sort-value="0.79" | 790 m || 
|-id=669 bgcolor=#fefefe
| 431669 ||  || — || February 9, 2008 || Kitt Peak || Spacewatch || — || align=right data-sort-value="0.86" | 860 m || 
|-id=670 bgcolor=#fefefe
| 431670 ||  || — || February 10, 2008 || Kitt Peak || Spacewatch || — || align=right data-sort-value="0.71" | 710 m || 
|-id=671 bgcolor=#fefefe
| 431671 ||  || — || February 12, 2008 || Dauban || F. Kugel || — || align=right data-sort-value="0.78" | 780 m || 
|-id=672 bgcolor=#fefefe
| 431672 ||  || — || December 31, 2007 || Mount Lemmon || Mount Lemmon Survey || — || align=right data-sort-value="0.70" | 700 m || 
|-id=673 bgcolor=#fefefe
| 431673 ||  || — || February 8, 2008 || Kitt Peak || Spacewatch || — || align=right data-sort-value="0.56" | 560 m || 
|-id=674 bgcolor=#fefefe
| 431674 ||  || — || February 9, 2008 || Catalina || CSS || — || align=right data-sort-value="0.83" | 830 m || 
|-id=675 bgcolor=#fefefe
| 431675 ||  || — || February 8, 2008 || Kitt Peak || Spacewatch || — || align=right data-sort-value="0.59" | 590 m || 
|-id=676 bgcolor=#fefefe
| 431676 ||  || — || February 11, 2008 || Kitt Peak || Spacewatch || — || align=right data-sort-value="0.96" | 960 m || 
|-id=677 bgcolor=#fefefe
| 431677 ||  || — || February 8, 2008 || Kitt Peak || Spacewatch || — || align=right data-sort-value="0.59" | 590 m || 
|-id=678 bgcolor=#fefefe
| 431678 ||  || — || February 6, 2008 || Socorro || LINEAR || — || align=right data-sort-value="0.68" | 680 m || 
|-id=679 bgcolor=#fefefe
| 431679 ||  || — || January 13, 2008 || Kitt Peak || Spacewatch || — || align=right data-sort-value="0.70" | 700 m || 
|-id=680 bgcolor=#fefefe
| 431680 ||  || — || January 11, 2008 || Mount Lemmon || Mount Lemmon Survey || — || align=right data-sort-value="0.89" | 890 m || 
|-id=681 bgcolor=#fefefe
| 431681 ||  || — || February 1, 2008 || Kitt Peak || Spacewatch || — || align=right data-sort-value="0.71" | 710 m || 
|-id=682 bgcolor=#fefefe
| 431682 ||  || — || February 26, 2008 || Mount Lemmon || Mount Lemmon Survey || — || align=right data-sort-value="0.66" | 660 m || 
|-id=683 bgcolor=#fefefe
| 431683 ||  || — || January 10, 2008 || Kitt Peak || Spacewatch || — || align=right data-sort-value="0.53" | 530 m || 
|-id=684 bgcolor=#fefefe
| 431684 ||  || — || February 9, 2008 || Kitt Peak || Spacewatch || — || align=right data-sort-value="0.67" | 670 m || 
|-id=685 bgcolor=#fefefe
| 431685 ||  || — || January 31, 2008 || Mount Lemmon || Mount Lemmon Survey || — || align=right data-sort-value="0.95" | 950 m || 
|-id=686 bgcolor=#FA8072
| 431686 ||  || — || February 27, 2008 || Mount Lemmon || Mount Lemmon Survey || — || align=right data-sort-value="0.96" | 960 m || 
|-id=687 bgcolor=#fefefe
| 431687 ||  || — || February 27, 2008 || Kitt Peak || Spacewatch || — || align=right data-sort-value="0.76" | 760 m || 
|-id=688 bgcolor=#fefefe
| 431688 ||  || — || February 27, 2008 || Kitt Peak || Spacewatch || — || align=right data-sort-value="0.75" | 750 m || 
|-id=689 bgcolor=#fefefe
| 431689 ||  || — || February 27, 2008 || Kitt Peak || Spacewatch || — || align=right data-sort-value="0.67" | 670 m || 
|-id=690 bgcolor=#fefefe
| 431690 ||  || — || February 27, 2008 || Mount Lemmon || Mount Lemmon Survey || — || align=right data-sort-value="0.87" | 870 m || 
|-id=691 bgcolor=#fefefe
| 431691 ||  || — || February 28, 2008 || Mount Lemmon || Mount Lemmon Survey || — || align=right data-sort-value="0.83" | 830 m || 
|-id=692 bgcolor=#fefefe
| 431692 ||  || — || February 2, 2008 || Kitt Peak || Spacewatch || NYS || align=right data-sort-value="0.60" | 600 m || 
|-id=693 bgcolor=#fefefe
| 431693 ||  || — || September 14, 2006 || Kitt Peak || Spacewatch || — || align=right data-sort-value="0.67" | 670 m || 
|-id=694 bgcolor=#fefefe
| 431694 ||  || — || February 28, 2008 || Mount Lemmon || Mount Lemmon Survey || — || align=right data-sort-value="0.82" | 820 m || 
|-id=695 bgcolor=#fefefe
| 431695 ||  || — || February 28, 2008 || Kitt Peak || Spacewatch || — || align=right data-sort-value="0.84" | 840 m || 
|-id=696 bgcolor=#fefefe
| 431696 ||  || — || February 28, 2008 || Kitt Peak || Spacewatch || MAS || align=right data-sort-value="0.54" | 540 m || 
|-id=697 bgcolor=#fefefe
| 431697 ||  || — || February 28, 2008 || Kitt Peak || Spacewatch || — || align=right data-sort-value="0.71" | 710 m || 
|-id=698 bgcolor=#FFC2E0
| 431698 ||  || — || March 2, 2008 || Mount Lemmon || Mount Lemmon Survey || APOcritical || align=right data-sort-value="0.78" | 780 m || 
|-id=699 bgcolor=#fefefe
| 431699 ||  || — || February 10, 2008 || Kitt Peak || Spacewatch || — || align=right data-sort-value="0.85" | 850 m || 
|-id=700 bgcolor=#fefefe
| 431700 ||  || — || March 3, 2008 || Catalina || CSS || — || align=right data-sort-value="0.84" | 840 m || 
|}

431701–431800 

|-bgcolor=#fefefe
| 431701 ||  || — || December 18, 2003 || Socorro || LINEAR || — || align=right data-sort-value="0.78" | 780 m || 
|-id=702 bgcolor=#fefefe
| 431702 ||  || — || March 7, 2008 || Mount Lemmon || Mount Lemmon Survey || — || align=right data-sort-value="0.57" | 570 m || 
|-id=703 bgcolor=#fefefe
| 431703 ||  || — || March 9, 2008 || Mount Lemmon || Mount Lemmon Survey || — || align=right data-sort-value="0.73" | 730 m || 
|-id=704 bgcolor=#FA8072
| 431704 ||  || — || March 11, 2008 || Catalina || CSS || critical || align=right data-sort-value="0.36" | 360 m || 
|-id=705 bgcolor=#fefefe
| 431705 ||  || — || March 7, 2008 || Kitt Peak || Spacewatch || — || align=right data-sort-value="0.60" | 600 m || 
|-id=706 bgcolor=#fefefe
| 431706 ||  || — || March 8, 2008 || Socorro || LINEAR || — || align=right data-sort-value="0.77" | 770 m || 
|-id=707 bgcolor=#fefefe
| 431707 ||  || — || February 26, 2008 || Kitt Peak || Spacewatch || — || align=right data-sort-value="0.66" | 660 m || 
|-id=708 bgcolor=#fefefe
| 431708 ||  || — || February 13, 2008 || Kitt Peak || Spacewatch || — || align=right data-sort-value="0.73" | 730 m || 
|-id=709 bgcolor=#fefefe
| 431709 ||  || — || March 8, 2008 || Kitt Peak || Spacewatch || critical || align=right data-sort-value="0.62" | 620 m || 
|-id=710 bgcolor=#fefefe
| 431710 ||  || — || March 8, 2008 || Kitt Peak || Spacewatch || — || align=right data-sort-value="0.72" | 720 m || 
|-id=711 bgcolor=#fefefe
| 431711 ||  || — || March 9, 2008 || Kitt Peak || Spacewatch || — || align=right data-sort-value="0.68" | 680 m || 
|-id=712 bgcolor=#fefefe
| 431712 ||  || — || March 9, 2008 || Kitt Peak || Spacewatch || — || align=right data-sort-value="0.80" | 800 m || 
|-id=713 bgcolor=#fefefe
| 431713 ||  || — || February 29, 2008 || Kitt Peak || Spacewatch || — || align=right data-sort-value="0.81" | 810 m || 
|-id=714 bgcolor=#FA8072
| 431714 ||  || — || February 10, 2008 || Kitt Peak || Spacewatch || — || align=right | 1.1 km || 
|-id=715 bgcolor=#fefefe
| 431715 ||  || — || February 13, 2008 || Mount Lemmon || Mount Lemmon Survey || — || align=right data-sort-value="0.82" | 820 m || 
|-id=716 bgcolor=#fefefe
| 431716 ||  || — || March 1, 2008 || Kitt Peak || Spacewatch || NYS || align=right data-sort-value="0.58" | 580 m || 
|-id=717 bgcolor=#fefefe
| 431717 ||  || — || March 1, 2008 || Kitt Peak || Spacewatch || — || align=right data-sort-value="0.69" | 690 m || 
|-id=718 bgcolor=#fefefe
| 431718 ||  || — || March 1, 2008 || Kitt Peak || Spacewatch || critical || align=right data-sort-value="0.65" | 650 m || 
|-id=719 bgcolor=#fefefe
| 431719 ||  || — || March 1, 2008 || Kitt Peak || Spacewatch || — || align=right data-sort-value="0.57" | 570 m || 
|-id=720 bgcolor=#fefefe
| 431720 ||  || — || March 10, 2008 || Kitt Peak || Spacewatch || — || align=right data-sort-value="0.78" | 780 m || 
|-id=721 bgcolor=#fefefe
| 431721 ||  || — || March 10, 2008 || Mount Lemmon || Mount Lemmon Survey || — || align=right data-sort-value="0.67" | 670 m || 
|-id=722 bgcolor=#fefefe
| 431722 ||  || — || March 6, 2008 || Catalina || CSS || — || align=right | 2.7 km || 
|-id=723 bgcolor=#fefefe
| 431723 ||  || — || March 9, 2008 || Socorro || LINEAR || — || align=right data-sort-value="0.78" | 780 m || 
|-id=724 bgcolor=#fefefe
| 431724 ||  || — || March 25, 2008 || Kitt Peak || Spacewatch || — || align=right data-sort-value="0.80" | 800 m || 
|-id=725 bgcolor=#fefefe
| 431725 ||  || — || February 28, 2008 || Mount Lemmon || Mount Lemmon Survey || — || align=right data-sort-value="0.72" | 720 m || 
|-id=726 bgcolor=#fefefe
| 431726 ||  || — || July 11, 2005 || Catalina || CSS || — || align=right | 1.3 km || 
|-id=727 bgcolor=#fefefe
| 431727 ||  || — || March 28, 2008 || Mount Lemmon || Mount Lemmon Survey || — || align=right data-sort-value="0.63" | 630 m || 
|-id=728 bgcolor=#fefefe
| 431728 ||  || — || March 28, 2008 || Kitt Peak || Spacewatch || NYS || align=right data-sort-value="0.71" | 710 m || 
|-id=729 bgcolor=#fefefe
| 431729 ||  || — || March 28, 2008 || Mount Lemmon || Mount Lemmon Survey || MAS || align=right data-sort-value="0.57" | 570 m || 
|-id=730 bgcolor=#fefefe
| 431730 ||  || — || March 28, 2008 || Mount Lemmon || Mount Lemmon Survey || — || align=right data-sort-value="0.71" | 710 m || 
|-id=731 bgcolor=#fefefe
| 431731 ||  || — || March 28, 2008 || Mount Lemmon || Mount Lemmon Survey || — || align=right data-sort-value="0.65" | 650 m || 
|-id=732 bgcolor=#fefefe
| 431732 ||  || — || March 28, 2008 || Mount Lemmon || Mount Lemmon Survey || — || align=right data-sort-value="0.62" | 620 m || 
|-id=733 bgcolor=#fefefe
| 431733 ||  || — || March 30, 2008 || Kitt Peak || Spacewatch || — || align=right data-sort-value="0.80" | 800 m || 
|-id=734 bgcolor=#fefefe
| 431734 ||  || — || March 28, 2008 || Mount Lemmon || Mount Lemmon Survey || NYS || align=right data-sort-value="0.69" | 690 m || 
|-id=735 bgcolor=#fefefe
| 431735 ||  || — || March 13, 2008 || Kitt Peak || Spacewatch || MAS || align=right data-sort-value="0.54" | 540 m || 
|-id=736 bgcolor=#fefefe
| 431736 ||  || — || March 28, 2008 || Mount Lemmon || Mount Lemmon Survey || MAS || align=right data-sort-value="0.66" | 660 m || 
|-id=737 bgcolor=#fefefe
| 431737 ||  || — || March 31, 2008 || Kitt Peak || Spacewatch || — || align=right data-sort-value="0.70" | 700 m || 
|-id=738 bgcolor=#fefefe
| 431738 ||  || — || March 31, 2008 || Kitt Peak || Spacewatch || — || align=right data-sort-value="0.77" | 770 m || 
|-id=739 bgcolor=#fefefe
| 431739 ||  || — || March 31, 2008 || Mount Lemmon || Mount Lemmon Survey || — || align=right data-sort-value="0.73" | 730 m || 
|-id=740 bgcolor=#fefefe
| 431740 ||  || — || March 31, 2008 || Kitt Peak || Spacewatch || — || align=right data-sort-value="0.68" | 680 m || 
|-id=741 bgcolor=#fefefe
| 431741 ||  || — || March 29, 2008 || Kitt Peak || Spacewatch || MAS || align=right data-sort-value="0.60" | 600 m || 
|-id=742 bgcolor=#fefefe
| 431742 ||  || — || March 29, 2008 || Kitt Peak || Spacewatch || — || align=right data-sort-value="0.65" | 650 m || 
|-id=743 bgcolor=#fefefe
| 431743 ||  || — || March 30, 2008 || Kitt Peak || Spacewatch || — || align=right data-sort-value="0.81" | 810 m || 
|-id=744 bgcolor=#d6d6d6
| 431744 ||  || — || October 10, 2007 || Catalina || CSS || — || align=right | 3.5 km || 
|-id=745 bgcolor=#fefefe
| 431745 ||  || — || March 12, 2008 || Kitt Peak || Spacewatch || — || align=right data-sort-value="0.67" | 670 m || 
|-id=746 bgcolor=#fefefe
| 431746 ||  || — || April 1, 2008 || Kitt Peak || Spacewatch || — || align=right data-sort-value="0.64" | 640 m || 
|-id=747 bgcolor=#fefefe
| 431747 ||  || — || April 1, 2008 || Kitt Peak || Spacewatch || — || align=right data-sort-value="0.75" | 750 m || 
|-id=748 bgcolor=#fefefe
| 431748 ||  || — || April 3, 2008 || Kitt Peak || Spacewatch || critical || align=right data-sort-value="0.65" | 650 m || 
|-id=749 bgcolor=#fefefe
| 431749 ||  || — || December 29, 2003 || Kitt Peak || Spacewatch || — || align=right data-sort-value="0.70" | 700 m || 
|-id=750 bgcolor=#fefefe
| 431750 ||  || — || April 5, 2008 || Mount Lemmon || Mount Lemmon Survey || — || align=right data-sort-value="0.78" | 780 m || 
|-id=751 bgcolor=#fefefe
| 431751 ||  || — || April 6, 2008 || Kitt Peak || Spacewatch || — || align=right data-sort-value="0.65" | 650 m || 
|-id=752 bgcolor=#fefefe
| 431752 ||  || — || April 7, 2008 || Mount Lemmon || Mount Lemmon Survey || — || align=right data-sort-value="0.74" | 740 m || 
|-id=753 bgcolor=#fefefe
| 431753 ||  || — || April 7, 2008 || Kitt Peak || Spacewatch || — || align=right data-sort-value="0.90" | 900 m || 
|-id=754 bgcolor=#fefefe
| 431754 ||  || — || April 7, 2008 || Kitt Peak || Spacewatch || — || align=right data-sort-value="0.82" | 820 m || 
|-id=755 bgcolor=#fefefe
| 431755 ||  || — || April 7, 2008 || Kitt Peak || Spacewatch || — || align=right data-sort-value="0.78" | 780 m || 
|-id=756 bgcolor=#fefefe
| 431756 ||  || — || April 6, 2008 || Kitt Peak || Spacewatch || NYS || align=right data-sort-value="0.60" | 600 m || 
|-id=757 bgcolor=#fefefe
| 431757 ||  || — || April 6, 2008 || Mount Lemmon || Mount Lemmon Survey || — || align=right data-sort-value="0.70" | 700 m || 
|-id=758 bgcolor=#fefefe
| 431758 ||  || — || April 11, 2008 || Kitt Peak || Spacewatch || — || align=right data-sort-value="0.82" | 820 m || 
|-id=759 bgcolor=#fefefe
| 431759 ||  || — || April 15, 2008 || Kitt Peak || Spacewatch || MAS || align=right data-sort-value="0.65" | 650 m || 
|-id=760 bgcolor=#FFC2E0
| 431760 ||  || — || April 18, 2008 || Catalina || CSS || APO +1km || align=right data-sort-value="0.85" | 850 m || 
|-id=761 bgcolor=#fefefe
| 431761 ||  || — || April 24, 2008 || Kitt Peak || Spacewatch || — || align=right data-sort-value="0.69" | 690 m || 
|-id=762 bgcolor=#fefefe
| 431762 ||  || — || July 5, 2005 || Kitt Peak || Spacewatch || — || align=right data-sort-value="0.82" | 820 m || 
|-id=763 bgcolor=#fefefe
| 431763 ||  || — || April 25, 2008 || Kitt Peak || Spacewatch || — || align=right data-sort-value="0.94" | 940 m || 
|-id=764 bgcolor=#fefefe
| 431764 ||  || — || April 28, 2008 || Kitt Peak || Spacewatch || — || align=right data-sort-value="0.78" | 780 m || 
|-id=765 bgcolor=#fefefe
| 431765 ||  || — || April 28, 2008 || Kitt Peak || Spacewatch || — || align=right data-sort-value="0.81" | 810 m || 
|-id=766 bgcolor=#fefefe
| 431766 ||  || — || March 15, 2008 || Kitt Peak || Spacewatch || — || align=right data-sort-value="0.76" | 760 m || 
|-id=767 bgcolor=#fefefe
| 431767 ||  || — || April 29, 2008 || Kitt Peak || Spacewatch || — || align=right data-sort-value="0.71" | 710 m || 
|-id=768 bgcolor=#d6d6d6
| 431768 ||  || — || April 29, 2008 || Kitt Peak || Spacewatch || SHU3:2 || align=right | 5.9 km || 
|-id=769 bgcolor=#fefefe
| 431769 ||  || — || April 29, 2008 || Kitt Peak || Spacewatch || NYS || align=right data-sort-value="0.69" | 690 m || 
|-id=770 bgcolor=#fefefe
| 431770 ||  || — || April 30, 2008 || Mount Lemmon || Mount Lemmon Survey || critical || align=right data-sort-value="0.68" | 680 m || 
|-id=771 bgcolor=#fefefe
| 431771 ||  || — || April 29, 2008 || Mount Lemmon || Mount Lemmon Survey || — || align=right data-sort-value="0.77" | 770 m || 
|-id=772 bgcolor=#fefefe
| 431772 ||  || — || May 2, 2008 || Mount Lemmon || Mount Lemmon Survey || — || align=right data-sort-value="0.91" | 910 m || 
|-id=773 bgcolor=#fefefe
| 431773 ||  || — || May 3, 2008 || Kitt Peak || Spacewatch || V || align=right data-sort-value="0.65" | 650 m || 
|-id=774 bgcolor=#fefefe
| 431774 ||  || — || May 3, 2008 || Mount Lemmon || Mount Lemmon Survey || — || align=right data-sort-value="0.58" | 580 m || 
|-id=775 bgcolor=#FFC2E0
| 431775 ||  || — || May 10, 2008 || Mount Lemmon || Mount Lemmon Survey || AMO || align=right data-sort-value="0.61" | 610 m || 
|-id=776 bgcolor=#FFC2E0
| 431776 ||  || — || October 29, 1998 || Anderson Mesa || LONEOS || AMO +1kmcritical || align=right data-sort-value="0.93" | 930 m || 
|-id=777 bgcolor=#fefefe
| 431777 ||  || — || May 14, 2008 || Catalina || CSS || — || align=right | 1.4 km || 
|-id=778 bgcolor=#fefefe
| 431778 ||  || — || May 3, 2008 || Mount Lemmon || Mount Lemmon Survey || — || align=right data-sort-value="0.71" | 710 m || 
|-id=779 bgcolor=#fefefe
| 431779 ||  || — || May 27, 2008 || Kitt Peak || Spacewatch || NYS || align=right data-sort-value="0.61" | 610 m || 
|-id=780 bgcolor=#fefefe
| 431780 ||  || — || June 1, 2008 || Mount Lemmon || Mount Lemmon Survey || — || align=right data-sort-value="0.74" | 740 m || 
|-id=781 bgcolor=#fefefe
| 431781 ||  || — || June 2, 2008 || Mount Lemmon || Mount Lemmon Survey || — || align=right data-sort-value="0.71" | 710 m || 
|-id=782 bgcolor=#fefefe
| 431782 ||  || — || June 6, 2008 || Kitt Peak || Spacewatch || NYScritical || align=right data-sort-value="0.60" | 600 m || 
|-id=783 bgcolor=#fefefe
| 431783 ||  || — || March 15, 2008 || Mount Lemmon || Mount Lemmon Survey || — || align=right data-sort-value="0.80" | 800 m || 
|-id=784 bgcolor=#fefefe
| 431784 ||  || — || June 22, 2008 || Kitt Peak || Spacewatch || — || align=right data-sort-value="0.85" | 850 m || 
|-id=785 bgcolor=#fefefe
| 431785 ||  || — || July 26, 2008 || Siding Spring || SSS || H || align=right data-sort-value="0.81" | 810 m || 
|-id=786 bgcolor=#E9E9E9
| 431786 ||  || — || July 30, 2008 || Kitt Peak || Spacewatch || 526 || align=right | 2.7 km || 
|-id=787 bgcolor=#d6d6d6
| 431787 ||  || — || December 12, 1999 || Kitt Peak || Spacewatch || EOS || align=right | 2.3 km || 
|-id=788 bgcolor=#E9E9E9
| 431788 ||  || — || August 5, 2008 || Hibiscus || S. F. Hönig, N. Teamo || (5) || align=right data-sort-value="0.97" | 970 m || 
|-id=789 bgcolor=#E9E9E9
| 431789 ||  || — || July 26, 2008 || Siding Spring || SSS || EUN || align=right | 1.3 km || 
|-id=790 bgcolor=#fefefe
| 431790 ||  || — || June 14, 2008 || Siding Spring || SSS || — || align=right | 1.3 km || 
|-id=791 bgcolor=#E9E9E9
| 431791 ||  || — || February 1, 2006 || Mount Lemmon || Mount Lemmon Survey || — || align=right | 2.5 km || 
|-id=792 bgcolor=#fefefe
| 431792 ||  || — || August 1, 2008 || Socorro || LINEAR || — || align=right | 1.2 km || 
|-id=793 bgcolor=#fefefe
| 431793 ||  || — || July 29, 2008 || Kitt Peak || Spacewatch || H || align=right data-sort-value="0.69" | 690 m || 
|-id=794 bgcolor=#E9E9E9
| 431794 ||  || — || August 23, 2008 || Hibiscus || N. Teamo || — || align=right | 1.3 km || 
|-id=795 bgcolor=#E9E9E9
| 431795 ||  || — || August 28, 2008 || La Sagra || OAM Obs. || JUN || align=right | 1.4 km || 
|-id=796 bgcolor=#E9E9E9
| 431796 ||  || — || August 29, 2008 || Pla D'Arguines || R. Ferrando || — || align=right | 1.8 km || 
|-id=797 bgcolor=#E9E9E9
| 431797 ||  || — || August 26, 2008 || Socorro || LINEAR || — || align=right | 2.3 km || 
|-id=798 bgcolor=#fefefe
| 431798 ||  || — || January 2, 2006 || Mount Lemmon || Mount Lemmon Survey || — || align=right data-sort-value="0.91" | 910 m || 
|-id=799 bgcolor=#fefefe
| 431799 ||  || — || July 29, 2008 || Kitt Peak || Spacewatch || MAS || align=right data-sort-value="0.69" | 690 m || 
|-id=800 bgcolor=#fefefe
| 431800 ||  || — || August 26, 2008 || Siding Spring || SSS || — || align=right | 1.4 km || 
|}

431801–431900 

|-bgcolor=#E9E9E9
| 431801 ||  || — || August 21, 2008 || Kitt Peak || Spacewatch || — || align=right | 3.1 km || 
|-id=802 bgcolor=#fefefe
| 431802 ||  || — || August 24, 2008 || Kitt Peak || Spacewatch || H || align=right data-sort-value="0.51" | 510 m || 
|-id=803 bgcolor=#E9E9E9
| 431803 ||  || — || August 31, 2008 || Moletai || Molėtai Obs. || — || align=right | 1.5 km || 
|-id=804 bgcolor=#E9E9E9
| 431804 ||  || — || July 29, 2008 || Mount Lemmon || Mount Lemmon Survey || — || align=right | 1.1 km || 
|-id=805 bgcolor=#E9E9E9
| 431805 ||  || — || September 3, 2008 || Kitt Peak || Spacewatch || EUN || align=right | 1.1 km || 
|-id=806 bgcolor=#C2FFFF
| 431806 ||  || — || August 24, 2008 || Kitt Peak || Spacewatch || L4 || align=right | 9.0 km || 
|-id=807 bgcolor=#C2FFFF
| 431807 ||  || — || September 4, 2008 || Kitt Peak || Spacewatch || L4 || align=right | 8.9 km || 
|-id=808 bgcolor=#E9E9E9
| 431808 ||  || — || August 24, 2008 || Kitt Peak || Spacewatch || — || align=right data-sort-value="0.98" | 980 m || 
|-id=809 bgcolor=#E9E9E9
| 431809 ||  || — || September 5, 2008 || Socorro || LINEAR || — || align=right | 2.6 km || 
|-id=810 bgcolor=#E9E9E9
| 431810 ||  || — || September 5, 2008 || Socorro || LINEAR || — || align=right | 2.1 km || 
|-id=811 bgcolor=#E9E9E9
| 431811 ||  || — || September 2, 2008 || Kitt Peak || Spacewatch || — || align=right data-sort-value="0.82" | 820 m || 
|-id=812 bgcolor=#E9E9E9
| 431812 ||  || — || September 2, 2008 || Kitt Peak || Spacewatch || — || align=right | 1.4 km || 
|-id=813 bgcolor=#E9E9E9
| 431813 ||  || — || September 2, 2008 || Kitt Peak || Spacewatch || — || align=right | 2.0 km || 
|-id=814 bgcolor=#E9E9E9
| 431814 ||  || — || September 2, 2008 || Kitt Peak || Spacewatch || — || align=right | 1.1 km || 
|-id=815 bgcolor=#E9E9E9
| 431815 ||  || — || September 3, 2008 || Kitt Peak || Spacewatch || — || align=right | 2.1 km || 
|-id=816 bgcolor=#E9E9E9
| 431816 ||  || — || September 4, 2008 || Kitt Peak || Spacewatch || — || align=right | 1.7 km || 
|-id=817 bgcolor=#E9E9E9
| 431817 ||  || — || September 4, 2008 || Kitt Peak || Spacewatch || — || align=right | 1.6 km || 
|-id=818 bgcolor=#E9E9E9
| 431818 ||  || — || September 4, 2008 || Kitt Peak || Spacewatch || — || align=right | 3.3 km || 
|-id=819 bgcolor=#E9E9E9
| 431819 ||  || — || September 7, 2008 || Catalina || CSS || — || align=right | 1.6 km || 
|-id=820 bgcolor=#E9E9E9
| 431820 ||  || — || September 6, 2008 || Catalina || CSS || (5) || align=right | 1.1 km || 
|-id=821 bgcolor=#FA8072
| 431821 ||  || — || September 7, 2008 || Catalina || CSS || — || align=right data-sort-value="0.89" | 890 m || 
|-id=822 bgcolor=#C2FFFF
| 431822 ||  || — || September 3, 2008 || Kitt Peak || Spacewatch || L4 || align=right | 6.6 km || 
|-id=823 bgcolor=#E9E9E9
| 431823 ||  || — || September 6, 2008 || Mount Lemmon || Mount Lemmon Survey || — || align=right | 1.4 km || 
|-id=824 bgcolor=#E9E9E9
| 431824 ||  || — || September 7, 2008 || Mount Lemmon || Mount Lemmon Survey || — || align=right | 2.0 km || 
|-id=825 bgcolor=#E9E9E9
| 431825 ||  || — || September 3, 2008 || Kitt Peak || Spacewatch || PAD || align=right | 1.6 km || 
|-id=826 bgcolor=#C2FFFF
| 431826 ||  || — || September 2, 2008 || Kitt Peak || Spacewatch || L4 || align=right | 8.5 km || 
|-id=827 bgcolor=#E9E9E9
| 431827 ||  || — || September 8, 2008 || Kitt Peak || Spacewatch || — || align=right | 1.7 km || 
|-id=828 bgcolor=#E9E9E9
| 431828 ||  || — || February 7, 2006 || Kitt Peak || Spacewatch || — || align=right | 1.4 km || 
|-id=829 bgcolor=#fefefe
| 431829 ||  || — || September 6, 2008 || Catalina || CSS || H || align=right data-sort-value="0.51" | 510 m || 
|-id=830 bgcolor=#E9E9E9
| 431830 ||  || — || September 21, 2008 || Hibiscus || N. Teamo || MAR || align=right | 1.0 km || 
|-id=831 bgcolor=#E9E9E9
| 431831 ||  || — || July 30, 2008 || Mount Lemmon || Mount Lemmon Survey || — || align=right | 1.7 km || 
|-id=832 bgcolor=#E9E9E9
| 431832 ||  || — || September 22, 2008 || Socorro || LINEAR || — || align=right | 1.6 km || 
|-id=833 bgcolor=#E9E9E9
| 431833 ||  || — || September 7, 2008 || Mount Lemmon || Mount Lemmon Survey || AEO || align=right | 1.2 km || 
|-id=834 bgcolor=#E9E9E9
| 431834 ||  || — || September 6, 2008 || Catalina || CSS || — || align=right | 1.6 km || 
|-id=835 bgcolor=#E9E9E9
| 431835 ||  || — || September 19, 2008 || Kitt Peak || Spacewatch || — || align=right | 3.4 km || 
|-id=836 bgcolor=#d6d6d6
| 431836 ||  || — || September 7, 2008 || Mount Lemmon || Mount Lemmon Survey || BRA || align=right | 1.1 km || 
|-id=837 bgcolor=#fefefe
| 431837 ||  || — || September 4, 2008 || Kitt Peak || Spacewatch || H || align=right data-sort-value="0.78" | 780 m || 
|-id=838 bgcolor=#E9E9E9
| 431838 ||  || — || September 20, 2008 || Kitt Peak || Spacewatch || — || align=right | 1.5 km || 
|-id=839 bgcolor=#E9E9E9
| 431839 ||  || — || September 6, 2008 || Mount Lemmon || Mount Lemmon Survey || — || align=right | 1.8 km || 
|-id=840 bgcolor=#d6d6d6
| 431840 ||  || — || September 20, 2008 || Kitt Peak || Spacewatch || BRA || align=right | 1.4 km || 
|-id=841 bgcolor=#E9E9E9
| 431841 ||  || — || September 20, 2008 || Kitt Peak || Spacewatch || — || align=right | 2.6 km || 
|-id=842 bgcolor=#E9E9E9
| 431842 ||  || — || September 4, 2008 || Kitt Peak || Spacewatch || — || align=right | 2.1 km || 
|-id=843 bgcolor=#E9E9E9
| 431843 ||  || — || September 20, 2008 || Mount Lemmon || Mount Lemmon Survey || — || align=right | 1.6 km || 
|-id=844 bgcolor=#E9E9E9
| 431844 ||  || — || September 20, 2008 || Mount Lemmon || Mount Lemmon Survey || — || align=right | 1.2 km || 
|-id=845 bgcolor=#E9E9E9
| 431845 ||  || — || September 20, 2008 || Mount Lemmon || Mount Lemmon Survey || — || align=right | 1.5 km || 
|-id=846 bgcolor=#E9E9E9
| 431846 ||  || — || September 20, 2008 || Kitt Peak || Spacewatch || MAR || align=right | 1.5 km || 
|-id=847 bgcolor=#E9E9E9
| 431847 ||  || — || September 20, 2008 || Kitt Peak || Spacewatch || — || align=right | 2.6 km || 
|-id=848 bgcolor=#E9E9E9
| 431848 ||  || — || September 20, 2008 || Kitt Peak || Spacewatch || — || align=right | 1.4 km || 
|-id=849 bgcolor=#E9E9E9
| 431849 ||  || — || September 20, 2008 || Catalina || CSS || — || align=right | 2.2 km || 
|-id=850 bgcolor=#E9E9E9
| 431850 ||  || — || September 21, 2008 || Mount Lemmon || Mount Lemmon Survey || — || align=right | 2.1 km || 
|-id=851 bgcolor=#E9E9E9
| 431851 ||  || — || September 6, 2008 || Mount Lemmon || Mount Lemmon Survey || — || align=right | 1.4 km || 
|-id=852 bgcolor=#E9E9E9
| 431852 ||  || — || September 9, 2008 || Mount Lemmon || Mount Lemmon Survey || EUN || align=right | 1.4 km || 
|-id=853 bgcolor=#E9E9E9
| 431853 ||  || — || September 22, 2008 || Kitt Peak || Spacewatch || — || align=right | 2.4 km || 
|-id=854 bgcolor=#E9E9E9
| 431854 ||  || — || September 24, 2008 || Dauban || F. Kugel || JUN || align=right | 1.1 km || 
|-id=855 bgcolor=#E9E9E9
| 431855 ||  || — || September 28, 2008 || Prairie Grass || J. Mahony || DOR || align=right | 2.8 km || 
|-id=856 bgcolor=#E9E9E9
| 431856 ||  || — || September 2, 2008 || Kitt Peak || Spacewatch || — || align=right | 1.7 km || 
|-id=857 bgcolor=#E9E9E9
| 431857 ||  || — || September 21, 2008 || Kitt Peak || Spacewatch || — || align=right | 2.6 km || 
|-id=858 bgcolor=#E9E9E9
| 431858 ||  || — || September 21, 2008 || Kitt Peak || Spacewatch || — || align=right | 2.2 km || 
|-id=859 bgcolor=#E9E9E9
| 431859 ||  || — || September 21, 2008 || Kitt Peak || Spacewatch || — || align=right | 1.0 km || 
|-id=860 bgcolor=#E9E9E9
| 431860 ||  || — || September 21, 2008 || Kitt Peak || Spacewatch || — || align=right | 2.5 km || 
|-id=861 bgcolor=#E9E9E9
| 431861 ||  || — || September 22, 2008 || Mount Lemmon || Mount Lemmon Survey || — || align=right data-sort-value="0.84" | 840 m || 
|-id=862 bgcolor=#E9E9E9
| 431862 ||  || — || September 22, 2008 || Kitt Peak || Spacewatch || — || align=right | 1.3 km || 
|-id=863 bgcolor=#E9E9E9
| 431863 ||  || — || September 22, 2008 || Kitt Peak || Spacewatch || — || align=right | 2.0 km || 
|-id=864 bgcolor=#E9E9E9
| 431864 ||  || — || September 22, 2008 || Kitt Peak || Spacewatch || HOF || align=right | 2.4 km || 
|-id=865 bgcolor=#E9E9E9
| 431865 ||  || — || September 22, 2008 || Mount Lemmon || Mount Lemmon Survey || NEM || align=right | 2.3 km || 
|-id=866 bgcolor=#E9E9E9
| 431866 ||  || — || September 22, 2008 || Mount Lemmon || Mount Lemmon Survey || — || align=right | 2.0 km || 
|-id=867 bgcolor=#E9E9E9
| 431867 ||  || — || September 22, 2008 || Mount Lemmon || Mount Lemmon Survey || — || align=right | 1.2 km || 
|-id=868 bgcolor=#C2FFFF
| 431868 ||  || — || September 23, 2008 || Kitt Peak || Spacewatch || L4 || align=right | 9.8 km || 
|-id=869 bgcolor=#E9E9E9
| 431869 ||  || — || September 24, 2008 || Catalina || CSS || — || align=right | 1.4 km || 
|-id=870 bgcolor=#d6d6d6
| 431870 ||  || — || September 24, 2008 || Mount Lemmon || Mount Lemmon Survey || — || align=right | 2.3 km || 
|-id=871 bgcolor=#E9E9E9
| 431871 ||  || — || September 20, 2008 || Catalina || CSS || JUN || align=right | 1.3 km || 
|-id=872 bgcolor=#E9E9E9
| 431872 ||  || — || September 28, 2008 || Socorro || LINEAR || — || align=right | 1.7 km || 
|-id=873 bgcolor=#E9E9E9
| 431873 ||  || — || September 24, 2008 || Kitt Peak || Spacewatch || — || align=right data-sort-value="0.99" | 990 m || 
|-id=874 bgcolor=#E9E9E9
| 431874 ||  || — || September 3, 2008 || Kitt Peak || Spacewatch || — || align=right | 1.9 km || 
|-id=875 bgcolor=#C2FFFF
| 431875 ||  || — || September 3, 2008 || Kitt Peak || Spacewatch || L4 || align=right | 7.8 km || 
|-id=876 bgcolor=#E9E9E9
| 431876 ||  || — || September 9, 2008 || Mount Lemmon || Mount Lemmon Survey || EUN || align=right | 1.5 km || 
|-id=877 bgcolor=#E9E9E9
| 431877 ||  || — || September 25, 2008 || Kitt Peak || Spacewatch || — || align=right | 2.3 km || 
|-id=878 bgcolor=#fefefe
| 431878 ||  || — || September 25, 2008 || Kitt Peak || Spacewatch || H || align=right data-sort-value="0.65" | 650 m || 
|-id=879 bgcolor=#E9E9E9
| 431879 ||  || — || September 26, 2008 || Kitt Peak || Spacewatch || — || align=right | 2.1 km || 
|-id=880 bgcolor=#E9E9E9
| 431880 ||  || — || September 7, 2008 || Mount Lemmon || Mount Lemmon Survey || — || align=right | 2.1 km || 
|-id=881 bgcolor=#E9E9E9
| 431881 ||  || — || September 6, 2008 || Mount Lemmon || Mount Lemmon Survey || — || align=right | 1.3 km || 
|-id=882 bgcolor=#E9E9E9
| 431882 ||  || — || September 26, 2008 || Kitt Peak || Spacewatch || — || align=right | 2.8 km || 
|-id=883 bgcolor=#E9E9E9
| 431883 ||  || — || September 30, 2008 || La Sagra || OAM Obs. || — || align=right | 2.9 km || 
|-id=884 bgcolor=#E9E9E9
| 431884 ||  || — || August 24, 2008 || Kitt Peak || Spacewatch || — || align=right | 1.0 km || 
|-id=885 bgcolor=#d6d6d6
| 431885 ||  || — || September 6, 2008 || Mount Lemmon || Mount Lemmon Survey || — || align=right | 2.5 km || 
|-id=886 bgcolor=#E9E9E9
| 431886 ||  || — || September 22, 2008 || Mount Lemmon || Mount Lemmon Survey || — || align=right | 1.9 km || 
|-id=887 bgcolor=#d6d6d6
| 431887 ||  || — || September 24, 2008 || Kitt Peak || Spacewatch || KOR || align=right | 1.3 km || 
|-id=888 bgcolor=#E9E9E9
| 431888 ||  || — || September 24, 2008 || Kitt Peak || Spacewatch || — || align=right data-sort-value="0.90" | 900 m || 
|-id=889 bgcolor=#E9E9E9
| 431889 ||  || — || September 25, 2008 || Kitt Peak || Spacewatch || AGN || align=right | 1.0 km || 
|-id=890 bgcolor=#E9E9E9
| 431890 ||  || — || September 26, 2008 || Kitt Peak || Spacewatch || HOF || align=right | 2.2 km || 
|-id=891 bgcolor=#E9E9E9
| 431891 ||  || — || September 28, 2008 || Mount Lemmon || Mount Lemmon Survey || — || align=right | 1.4 km || 
|-id=892 bgcolor=#E9E9E9
| 431892 ||  || — || September 24, 2008 || Kitt Peak || Spacewatch || AST || align=right | 1.4 km || 
|-id=893 bgcolor=#E9E9E9
| 431893 ||  || — || September 6, 2008 || Catalina || CSS || — || align=right | 2.4 km || 
|-id=894 bgcolor=#E9E9E9
| 431894 ||  || — || September 24, 2008 || Kitt Peak || Spacewatch || — || align=right | 1.9 km || 
|-id=895 bgcolor=#E9E9E9
| 431895 ||  || — || September 24, 2008 || Kitt Peak || Spacewatch || — || align=right | 1.9 km || 
|-id=896 bgcolor=#E9E9E9
| 431896 ||  || — || September 22, 2008 || Kitt Peak || Spacewatch || WIT || align=right data-sort-value="0.91" | 910 m || 
|-id=897 bgcolor=#E9E9E9
| 431897 ||  || — || September 23, 2008 || Kitt Peak || Spacewatch || — || align=right | 1.3 km || 
|-id=898 bgcolor=#fefefe
| 431898 ||  || — || September 23, 2008 || Kitt Peak || Spacewatch || H || align=right data-sort-value="0.58" | 580 m || 
|-id=899 bgcolor=#E9E9E9
| 431899 ||  || — || September 27, 2008 || Mount Lemmon || Mount Lemmon Survey || — || align=right | 2.5 km || 
|-id=900 bgcolor=#E9E9E9
| 431900 ||  || — || September 28, 2008 || Socorro || LINEAR || — || align=right | 1.9 km || 
|}

431901–432000 

|-bgcolor=#fefefe
| 431901 ||  || — || October 3, 2008 || La Sagra || OAM Obs. || H || align=right data-sort-value="0.95" | 950 m || 
|-id=902 bgcolor=#E9E9E9
| 431902 ||  || — || October 1, 2008 || La Sagra || OAM Obs. || — || align=right | 2.5 km || 
|-id=903 bgcolor=#E9E9E9
| 431903 ||  || — || September 29, 2008 || Catalina || CSS || — || align=right | 2.9 km || 
|-id=904 bgcolor=#fefefe
| 431904 ||  || — || October 5, 2008 || La Sagra || OAM Obs. || H || align=right data-sort-value="0.65" | 650 m || 
|-id=905 bgcolor=#E9E9E9
| 431905 ||  || — || October 2, 2008 || Kitt Peak || Spacewatch || — || align=right | 1.3 km || 
|-id=906 bgcolor=#d6d6d6
| 431906 ||  || — || September 6, 2008 || Mount Lemmon || Mount Lemmon Survey || THM || align=right | 2.0 km || 
|-id=907 bgcolor=#d6d6d6
| 431907 ||  || — || October 1, 2008 || Kitt Peak || Spacewatch || KOR || align=right | 1.1 km || 
|-id=908 bgcolor=#E9E9E9
| 431908 ||  || — || October 1, 2008 || Kitt Peak || Spacewatch || — || align=right | 1.9 km || 
|-id=909 bgcolor=#d6d6d6
| 431909 ||  || — || October 16, 2003 || Kitt Peak || Spacewatch || — || align=right | 1.8 km || 
|-id=910 bgcolor=#C2FFFF
| 431910 ||  || — || October 1, 2008 || Mount Lemmon || Mount Lemmon Survey || L4 || align=right | 9.9 km || 
|-id=911 bgcolor=#E9E9E9
| 431911 ||  || — || October 1, 2008 || Kitt Peak || Spacewatch || HOF || align=right | 2.3 km || 
|-id=912 bgcolor=#E9E9E9
| 431912 ||  || — || October 1, 2008 || Kitt Peak || Spacewatch || AGN || align=right | 1.1 km || 
|-id=913 bgcolor=#E9E9E9
| 431913 ||  || — || September 16, 2003 || Kitt Peak || Spacewatch || — || align=right | 1.9 km || 
|-id=914 bgcolor=#E9E9E9
| 431914 ||  || — || April 22, 2007 || Kitt Peak || Spacewatch || — || align=right | 1.2 km || 
|-id=915 bgcolor=#d6d6d6
| 431915 ||  || — || September 24, 2008 || Kitt Peak || Spacewatch || KOR || align=right | 1.1 km || 
|-id=916 bgcolor=#E9E9E9
| 431916 ||  || — || September 6, 2008 || Mount Lemmon || Mount Lemmon Survey || — || align=right | 2.3 km || 
|-id=917 bgcolor=#d6d6d6
| 431917 ||  || — || October 2, 2008 || Kitt Peak || Spacewatch || — || align=right | 2.1 km || 
|-id=918 bgcolor=#E9E9E9
| 431918 ||  || — || September 24, 2008 || Kitt Peak || Spacewatch || — || align=right | 2.0 km || 
|-id=919 bgcolor=#E9E9E9
| 431919 ||  || — || October 2, 2008 || Kitt Peak || Spacewatch || AST || align=right | 1.6 km || 
|-id=920 bgcolor=#E9E9E9
| 431920 ||  || — || October 2, 2008 || Kitt Peak || Spacewatch || — || align=right | 2.0 km || 
|-id=921 bgcolor=#E9E9E9
| 431921 ||  || — || October 2, 2008 || Kitt Peak || Spacewatch || — || align=right | 2.9 km || 
|-id=922 bgcolor=#E9E9E9
| 431922 ||  || — || October 2, 2008 || Kitt Peak || Spacewatch || — || align=right | 1.9 km || 
|-id=923 bgcolor=#E9E9E9
| 431923 ||  || — || September 21, 2008 || Kitt Peak || Spacewatch || — || align=right | 1.9 km || 
|-id=924 bgcolor=#E9E9E9
| 431924 ||  || — || October 4, 2008 || La Sagra || OAM Obs. || — || align=right | 1.7 km || 
|-id=925 bgcolor=#E9E9E9
| 431925 ||  || — || September 14, 1999 || Kitt Peak || Spacewatch || — || align=right | 1.4 km || 
|-id=926 bgcolor=#E9E9E9
| 431926 ||  || — || October 6, 2008 || Kitt Peak || Spacewatch || — || align=right | 1.8 km || 
|-id=927 bgcolor=#E9E9E9
| 431927 ||  || — || September 23, 2008 || Kitt Peak || Spacewatch || — || align=right | 1.9 km || 
|-id=928 bgcolor=#E9E9E9
| 431928 ||  || — || February 25, 2006 || Kitt Peak || Spacewatch || PAD || align=right | 1.6 km || 
|-id=929 bgcolor=#E9E9E9
| 431929 ||  || — || September 23, 2008 || Kitt Peak || Spacewatch || — || align=right | 2.1 km || 
|-id=930 bgcolor=#E9E9E9
| 431930 ||  || — || September 23, 2008 || Kitt Peak || Spacewatch || — || align=right | 2.3 km || 
|-id=931 bgcolor=#E9E9E9
| 431931 ||  || — || September 9, 2008 || Mount Lemmon || Mount Lemmon Survey || — || align=right | 2.1 km || 
|-id=932 bgcolor=#E9E9E9
| 431932 ||  || — || December 11, 2004 || Kitt Peak || Spacewatch || AST || align=right | 1.4 km || 
|-id=933 bgcolor=#E9E9E9
| 431933 ||  || — || September 3, 2008 || Kitt Peak || Spacewatch || AST || align=right | 1.5 km || 
|-id=934 bgcolor=#E9E9E9
| 431934 ||  || — || September 20, 2008 || Mount Lemmon || Mount Lemmon Survey || — || align=right | 1.9 km || 
|-id=935 bgcolor=#C2FFFF
| 431935 ||  || — || April 11, 2003 || Kitt Peak || Spacewatch || L4 || align=right | 7.8 km || 
|-id=936 bgcolor=#E9E9E9
| 431936 ||  || — || October 6, 2008 || Mount Lemmon || Mount Lemmon Survey || — || align=right | 2.6 km || 
|-id=937 bgcolor=#E9E9E9
| 431937 ||  || — || October 9, 2008 || Kitt Peak || Spacewatch || NEM || align=right | 1.9 km || 
|-id=938 bgcolor=#E9E9E9
| 431938 ||  || — || October 2, 2008 || Mount Lemmon || Mount Lemmon Survey || — || align=right | 2.0 km || 
|-id=939 bgcolor=#E9E9E9
| 431939 ||  || — || October 3, 2008 || Mount Lemmon || Mount Lemmon Survey || — || align=right | 2.0 km || 
|-id=940 bgcolor=#E9E9E9
| 431940 ||  || — || October 7, 2008 || Mount Lemmon || Mount Lemmon Survey || — || align=right | 1.5 km || 
|-id=941 bgcolor=#E9E9E9
| 431941 ||  || — || October 6, 2008 || Kitt Peak || Spacewatch || — || align=right | 1.8 km || 
|-id=942 bgcolor=#fefefe
| 431942 ||  || — || October 10, 2008 || Catalina || CSS || H || align=right data-sort-value="0.51" | 510 m || 
|-id=943 bgcolor=#E9E9E9
| 431943 ||  || — || October 17, 2008 || Kitt Peak || Spacewatch || — || align=right | 1.7 km || 
|-id=944 bgcolor=#E9E9E9
| 431944 ||  || — || October 17, 2008 || Kitt Peak || Spacewatch || AGN || align=right | 1.1 km || 
|-id=945 bgcolor=#d6d6d6
| 431945 ||  || — || October 19, 2008 || Kitt Peak || Spacewatch || — || align=right | 1.9 km || 
|-id=946 bgcolor=#E9E9E9
| 431946 ||  || — || October 20, 2008 || Kitt Peak || Spacewatch || — || align=right | 2.2 km || 
|-id=947 bgcolor=#E9E9E9
| 431947 ||  || — || October 20, 2008 || Kitt Peak || Spacewatch || — || align=right | 1.8 km || 
|-id=948 bgcolor=#E9E9E9
| 431948 ||  || — || October 20, 2008 || Kitt Peak || Spacewatch || AGN || align=right | 1.3 km || 
|-id=949 bgcolor=#E9E9E9
| 431949 ||  || — || September 6, 2008 || Mount Lemmon || Mount Lemmon Survey || — || align=right | 2.1 km || 
|-id=950 bgcolor=#E9E9E9
| 431950 ||  || — || October 2, 2008 || Mount Lemmon || Mount Lemmon Survey || — || align=right | 1.3 km || 
|-id=951 bgcolor=#E9E9E9
| 431951 ||  || — || October 20, 2008 || Kitt Peak || Spacewatch || — || align=right | 1.6 km || 
|-id=952 bgcolor=#E9E9E9
| 431952 ||  || — || October 21, 2008 || Kitt Peak || Spacewatch || AGN || align=right | 1.1 km || 
|-id=953 bgcolor=#fefefe
| 431953 ||  || — || October 21, 2008 || Kitt Peak || Spacewatch || H || align=right data-sort-value="0.68" | 680 m || 
|-id=954 bgcolor=#fefefe
| 431954 ||  || — || October 21, 2008 || Kitt Peak || Spacewatch || H || align=right data-sort-value="0.75" | 750 m || 
|-id=955 bgcolor=#E9E9E9
| 431955 ||  || — || September 24, 2008 || Mount Lemmon || Mount Lemmon Survey || — || align=right | 1.7 km || 
|-id=956 bgcolor=#E9E9E9
| 431956 ||  || — || October 21, 2008 || Kitt Peak || Spacewatch || HOF || align=right | 3.2 km || 
|-id=957 bgcolor=#fefefe
| 431957 ||  || — || October 23, 2008 || Mount Lemmon || Mount Lemmon Survey || H || align=right data-sort-value="0.59" | 590 m || 
|-id=958 bgcolor=#E9E9E9
| 431958 ||  || — || October 8, 2008 || Kitt Peak || Spacewatch || HOF || align=right | 2.3 km || 
|-id=959 bgcolor=#fefefe
| 431959 ||  || — || October 24, 2008 || Socorro || LINEAR || H || align=right data-sort-value="0.84" | 840 m || 
|-id=960 bgcolor=#E9E9E9
| 431960 ||  || — || September 26, 2008 || Kitt Peak || Spacewatch || — || align=right | 1.7 km || 
|-id=961 bgcolor=#E9E9E9
| 431961 ||  || — || October 7, 2008 || Mount Lemmon || Mount Lemmon Survey || — || align=right | 1.7 km || 
|-id=962 bgcolor=#d6d6d6
| 431962 ||  || — || October 21, 2008 || Kitt Peak || Spacewatch || — || align=right | 2.5 km || 
|-id=963 bgcolor=#fefefe
| 431963 ||  || — || October 21, 2008 || Mount Lemmon || Mount Lemmon Survey || H || align=right data-sort-value="0.96" | 960 m || 
|-id=964 bgcolor=#E9E9E9
| 431964 ||  || — || October 22, 2008 || Kitt Peak || Spacewatch || EUN || align=right | 1.1 km || 
|-id=965 bgcolor=#E9E9E9
| 431965 ||  || — || October 22, 2008 || Kitt Peak || Spacewatch || (194) || align=right | 1.6 km || 
|-id=966 bgcolor=#E9E9E9
| 431966 ||  || — || October 22, 2008 || Kitt Peak || Spacewatch || — || align=right | 1.0 km || 
|-id=967 bgcolor=#d6d6d6
| 431967 ||  || — || October 22, 2008 || Kitt Peak || Spacewatch || — || align=right | 2.8 km || 
|-id=968 bgcolor=#E9E9E9
| 431968 ||  || — || October 2, 2008 || Kitt Peak || Spacewatch || (5) || align=right data-sort-value="0.71" | 710 m || 
|-id=969 bgcolor=#E9E9E9
| 431969 ||  || — || September 6, 2008 || Mount Lemmon || Mount Lemmon Survey || PAD || align=right | 1.8 km || 
|-id=970 bgcolor=#E9E9E9
| 431970 ||  || — || October 23, 2008 || Kitt Peak || Spacewatch || — || align=right | 3.1 km || 
|-id=971 bgcolor=#E9E9E9
| 431971 ||  || — || October 23, 2008 || Kitt Peak || Spacewatch || AST || align=right | 2.7 km || 
|-id=972 bgcolor=#d6d6d6
| 431972 ||  || — || November 15, 2003 || Kitt Peak || Spacewatch || — || align=right | 1.6 km || 
|-id=973 bgcolor=#d6d6d6
| 431973 ||  || — || October 23, 2008 || Kitt Peak || Spacewatch || KOR || align=right | 1.4 km || 
|-id=974 bgcolor=#E9E9E9
| 431974 ||  || — || October 10, 2008 || Kitt Peak || Spacewatch || EUN || align=right | 1.4 km || 
|-id=975 bgcolor=#E9E9E9
| 431975 ||  || — || February 27, 2006 || Kitt Peak || Spacewatch || — || align=right | 1.4 km || 
|-id=976 bgcolor=#d6d6d6
| 431976 ||  || — || October 23, 2008 || Mount Lemmon || Mount Lemmon Survey || KOR || align=right | 1.4 km || 
|-id=977 bgcolor=#E9E9E9
| 431977 ||  || — || October 24, 2008 || Kitt Peak || Spacewatch || — || align=right | 1.9 km || 
|-id=978 bgcolor=#E9E9E9
| 431978 ||  || — || October 2, 2008 || Mount Lemmon || Mount Lemmon Survey || EUN || align=right | 1.3 km || 
|-id=979 bgcolor=#E9E9E9
| 431979 ||  || — || September 23, 2008 || Kitt Peak || Spacewatch || WIT || align=right | 1.1 km || 
|-id=980 bgcolor=#E9E9E9
| 431980 ||  || — || October 24, 2008 || Kitt Peak || Spacewatch || — || align=right | 2.5 km || 
|-id=981 bgcolor=#E9E9E9
| 431981 ||  || — || October 24, 2008 || Kitt Peak || Spacewatch || — || align=right | 2.2 km || 
|-id=982 bgcolor=#d6d6d6
| 431982 ||  || — || October 24, 2008 || Kitt Peak || Spacewatch || — || align=right | 3.4 km || 
|-id=983 bgcolor=#E9E9E9
| 431983 ||  || — || October 7, 2008 || Mount Lemmon || Mount Lemmon Survey || — || align=right | 1.7 km || 
|-id=984 bgcolor=#E9E9E9
| 431984 ||  || — || October 27, 2008 || Mount Lemmon || Mount Lemmon Survey || — || align=right | 1.1 km || 
|-id=985 bgcolor=#E9E9E9
| 431985 ||  || — || October 23, 2008 || Kitt Peak || Spacewatch || — || align=right | 1.8 km || 
|-id=986 bgcolor=#E9E9E9
| 431986 ||  || — || October 23, 2008 || Kitt Peak || Spacewatch || — || align=right | 1.3 km || 
|-id=987 bgcolor=#E9E9E9
| 431987 ||  || — || October 1, 2008 || Mount Lemmon || Mount Lemmon Survey || — || align=right | 1.9 km || 
|-id=988 bgcolor=#d6d6d6
| 431988 ||  || — || October 26, 2008 || Kitt Peak || Spacewatch || — || align=right | 2.6 km || 
|-id=989 bgcolor=#E9E9E9
| 431989 ||  || — || October 27, 2008 || Kitt Peak || Spacewatch || — || align=right | 1.9 km || 
|-id=990 bgcolor=#E9E9E9
| 431990 ||  || — || October 27, 2008 || Kitt Peak || Spacewatch || — || align=right | 2.1 km || 
|-id=991 bgcolor=#E9E9E9
| 431991 ||  || — || October 27, 2008 || Kitt Peak || Spacewatch || NEM || align=right | 2.2 km || 
|-id=992 bgcolor=#d6d6d6
| 431992 ||  || — || October 27, 2008 || Kitt Peak || Spacewatch || BRA || align=right | 1.4 km || 
|-id=993 bgcolor=#E9E9E9
| 431993 ||  || — || October 9, 2008 || Kitt Peak || Spacewatch || — || align=right | 2.0 km || 
|-id=994 bgcolor=#E9E9E9
| 431994 ||  || — || October 28, 2008 || Kitt Peak || Spacewatch || — || align=right | 1.7 km || 
|-id=995 bgcolor=#d6d6d6
| 431995 ||  || — || October 28, 2008 || Mount Lemmon || Mount Lemmon Survey || KOR || align=right | 1.2 km || 
|-id=996 bgcolor=#E9E9E9
| 431996 ||  || — || October 20, 2008 || Kitt Peak || Spacewatch || — || align=right | 1.8 km || 
|-id=997 bgcolor=#d6d6d6
| 431997 ||  || — || September 29, 2008 || Kitt Peak || Spacewatch || — || align=right | 2.0 km || 
|-id=998 bgcolor=#E9E9E9
| 431998 ||  || — || October 20, 2008 || Kitt Peak || Spacewatch || EUN || align=right | 1.2 km || 
|-id=999 bgcolor=#d6d6d6
| 431999 ||  || — || October 29, 2008 || Kitt Peak || Spacewatch || — || align=right | 2.4 km || 
|-id=000 bgcolor=#E9E9E9
| 432000 ||  || — || October 29, 2008 || Kitt Peak || Spacewatch || — || align=right | 1.5 km || 
|}

References

External links 
 Discovery Circumstances: Numbered Minor Planets (430001)–(435000) (IAU Minor Planet Center)

0431